= Silicon Valley =

Technology hub in California, United States

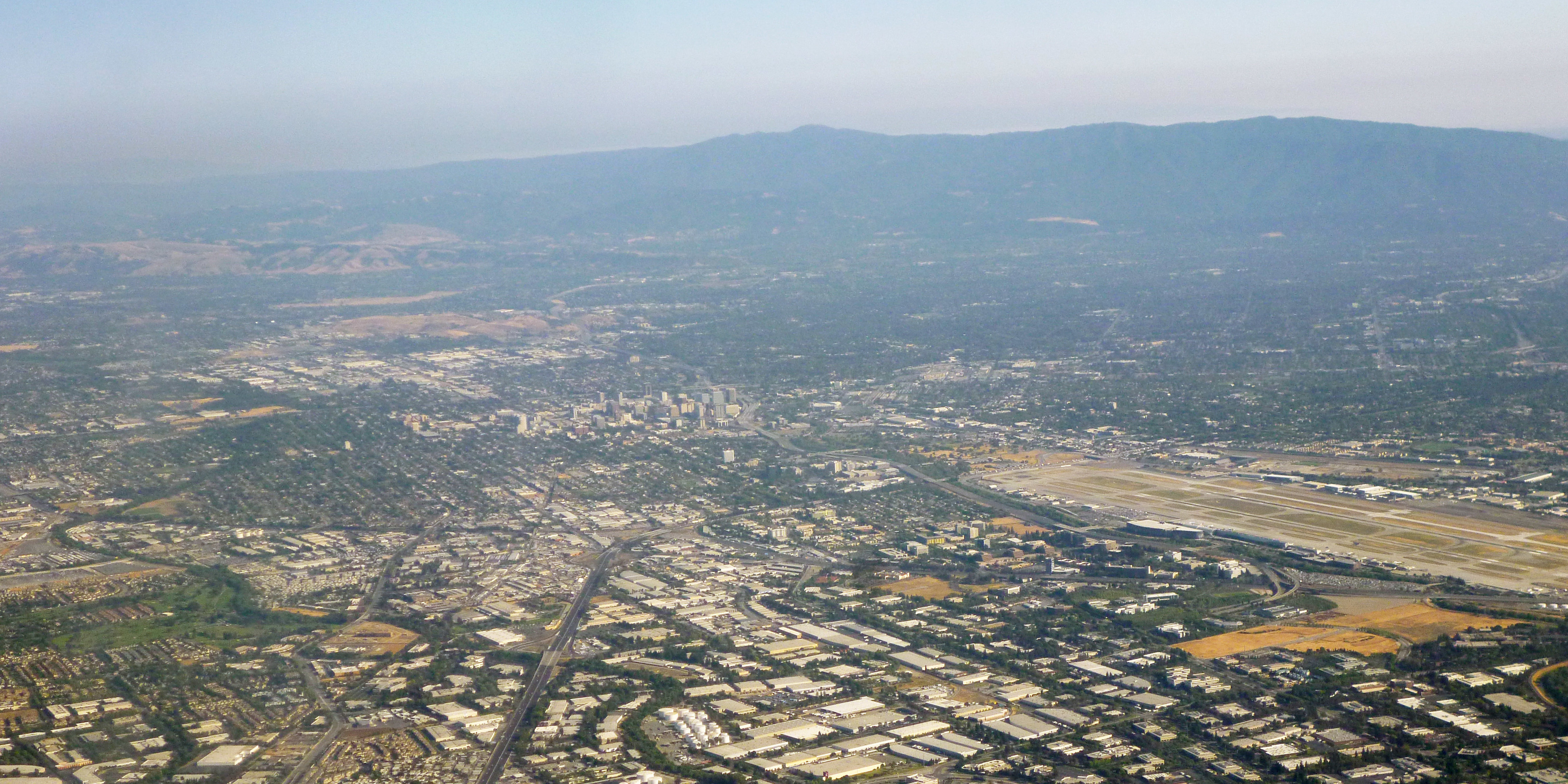
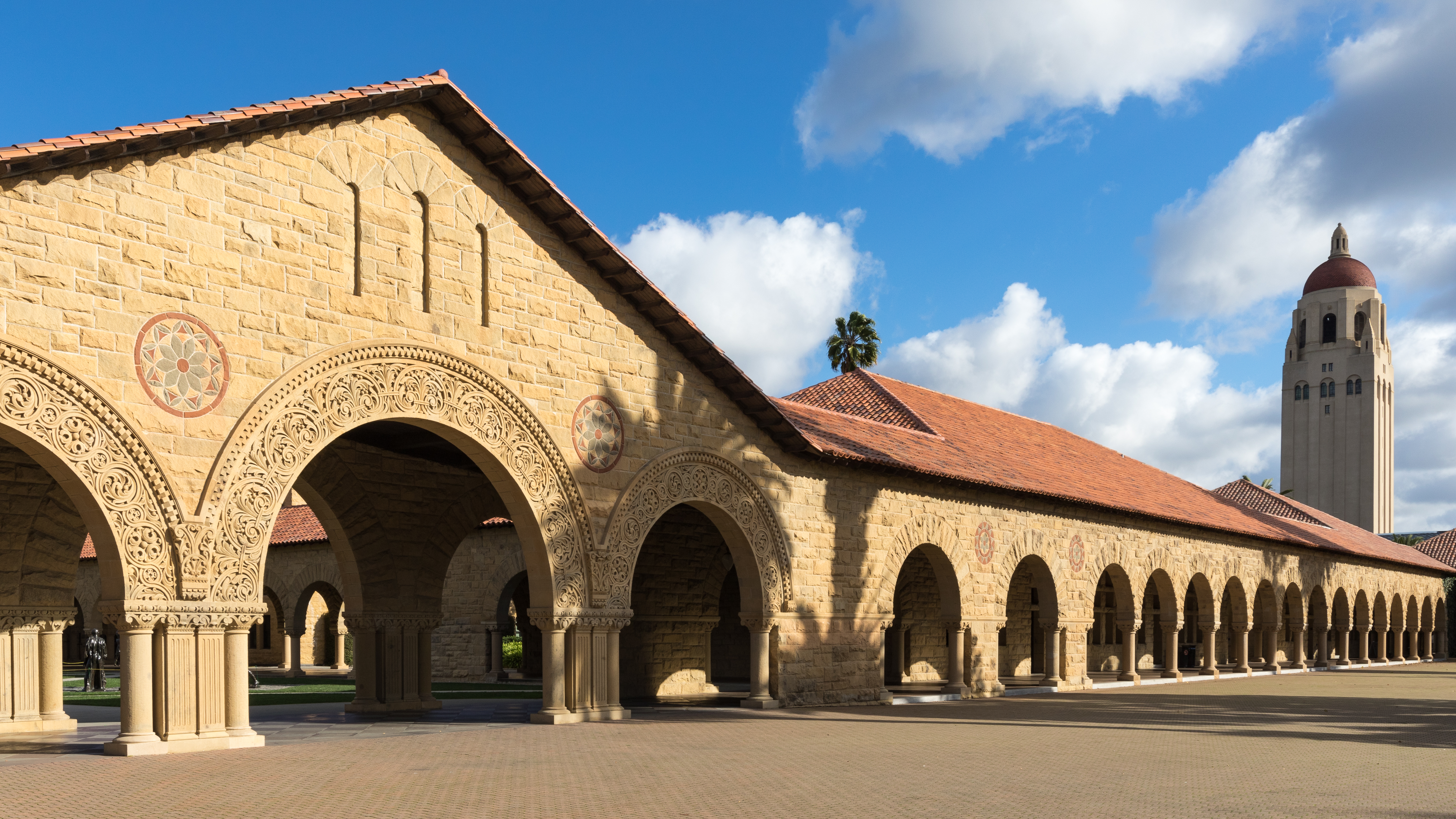
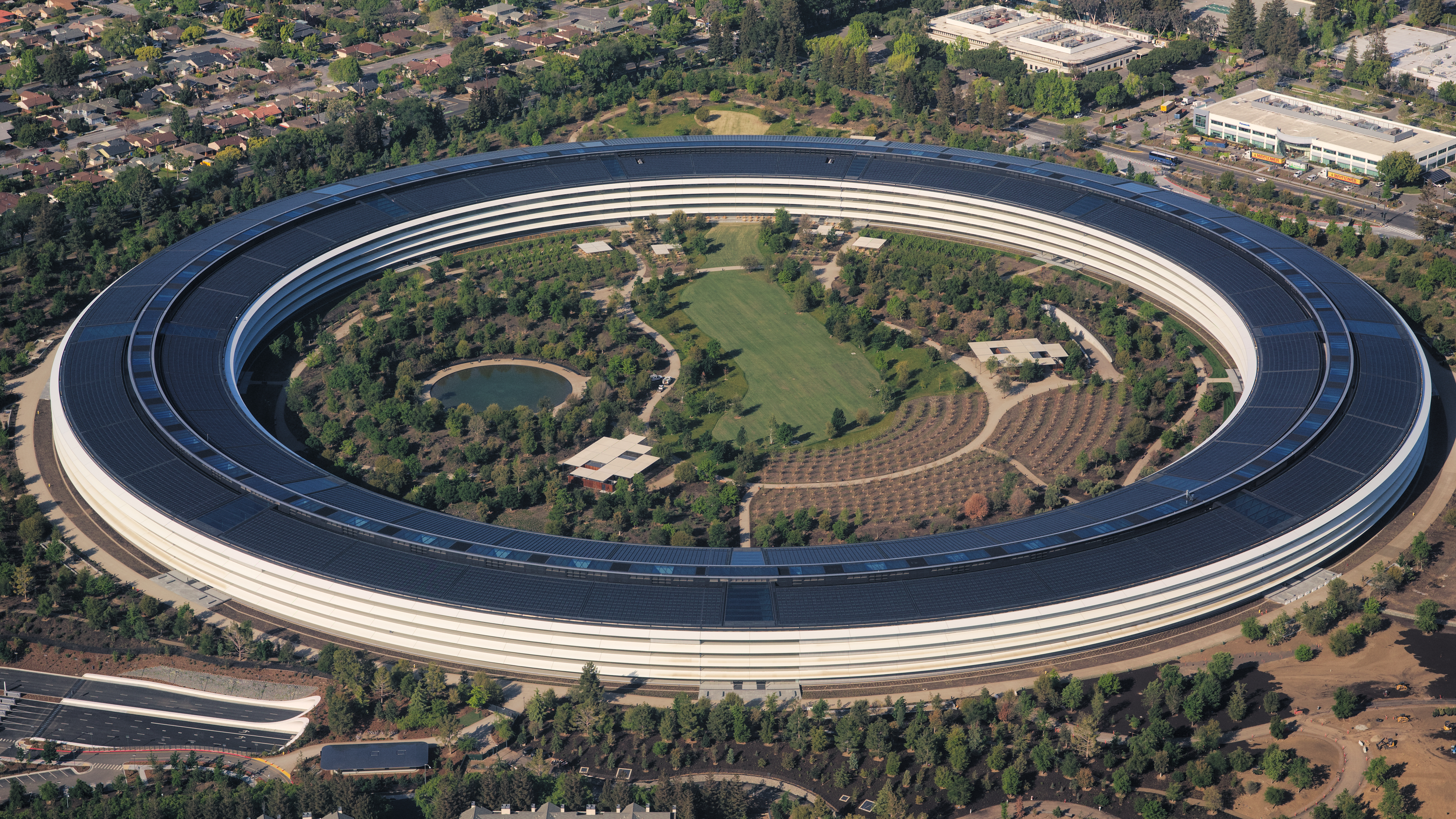
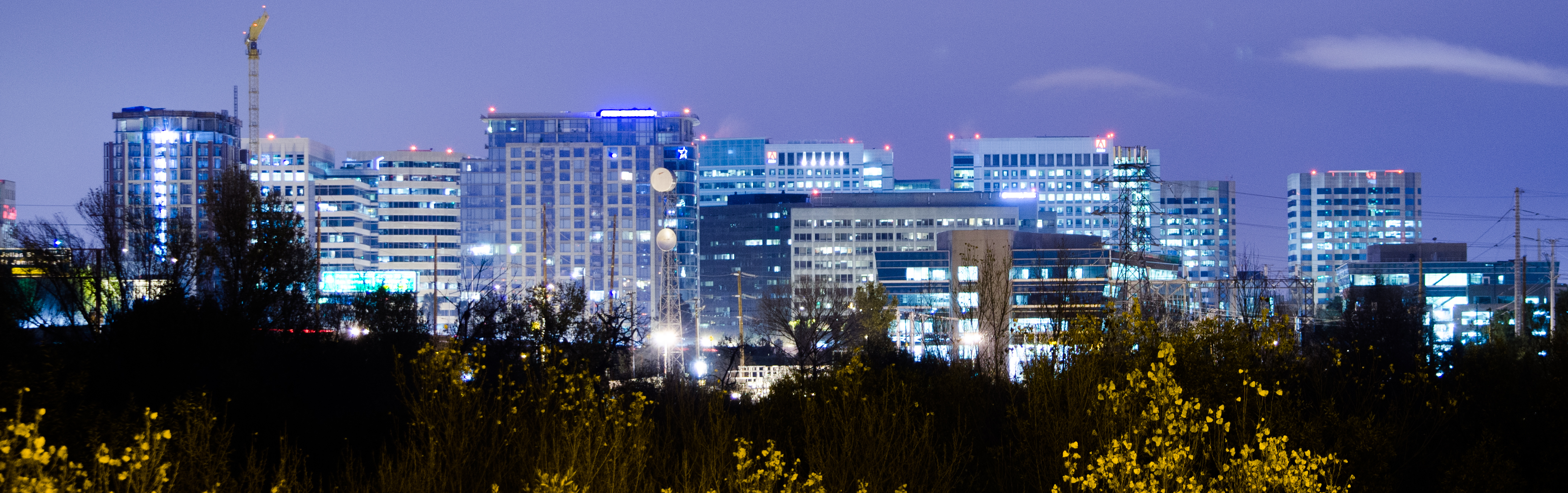
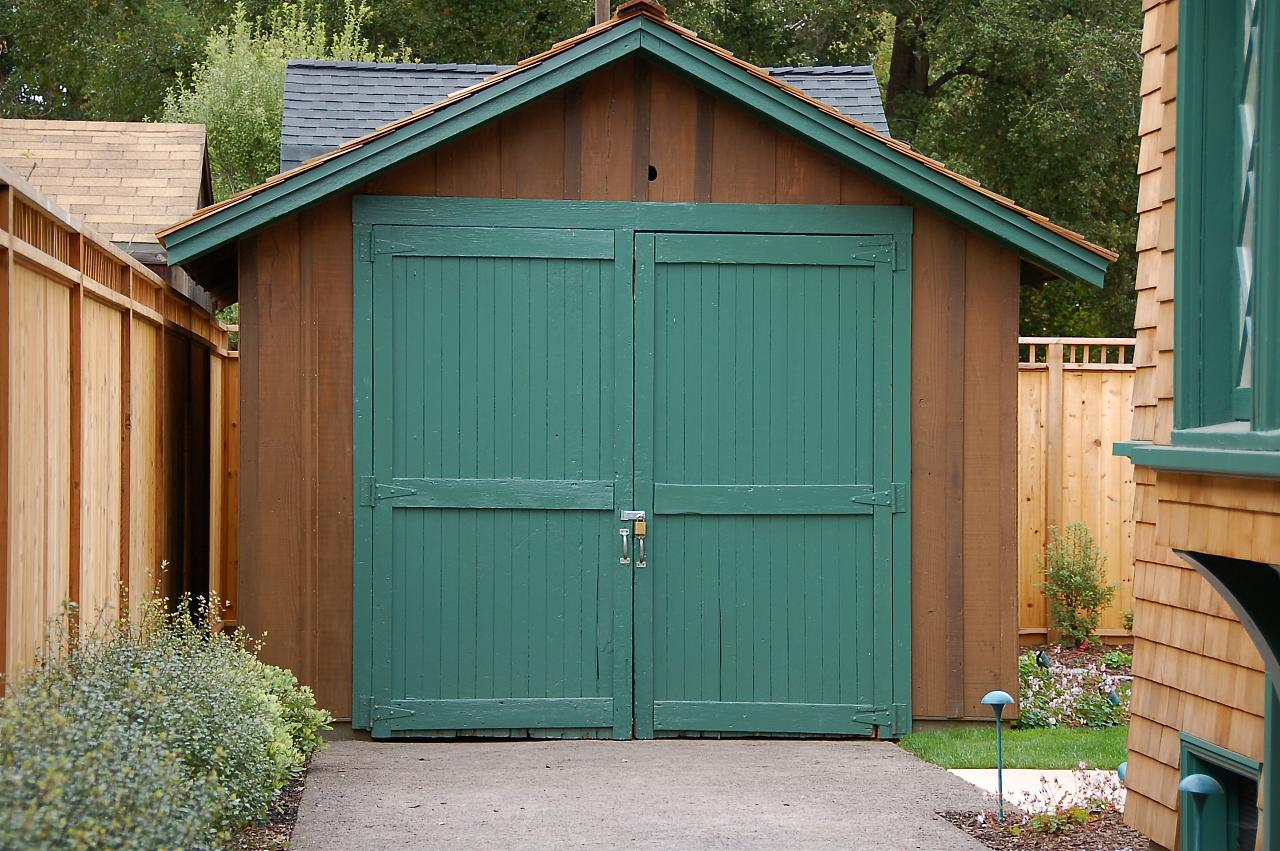
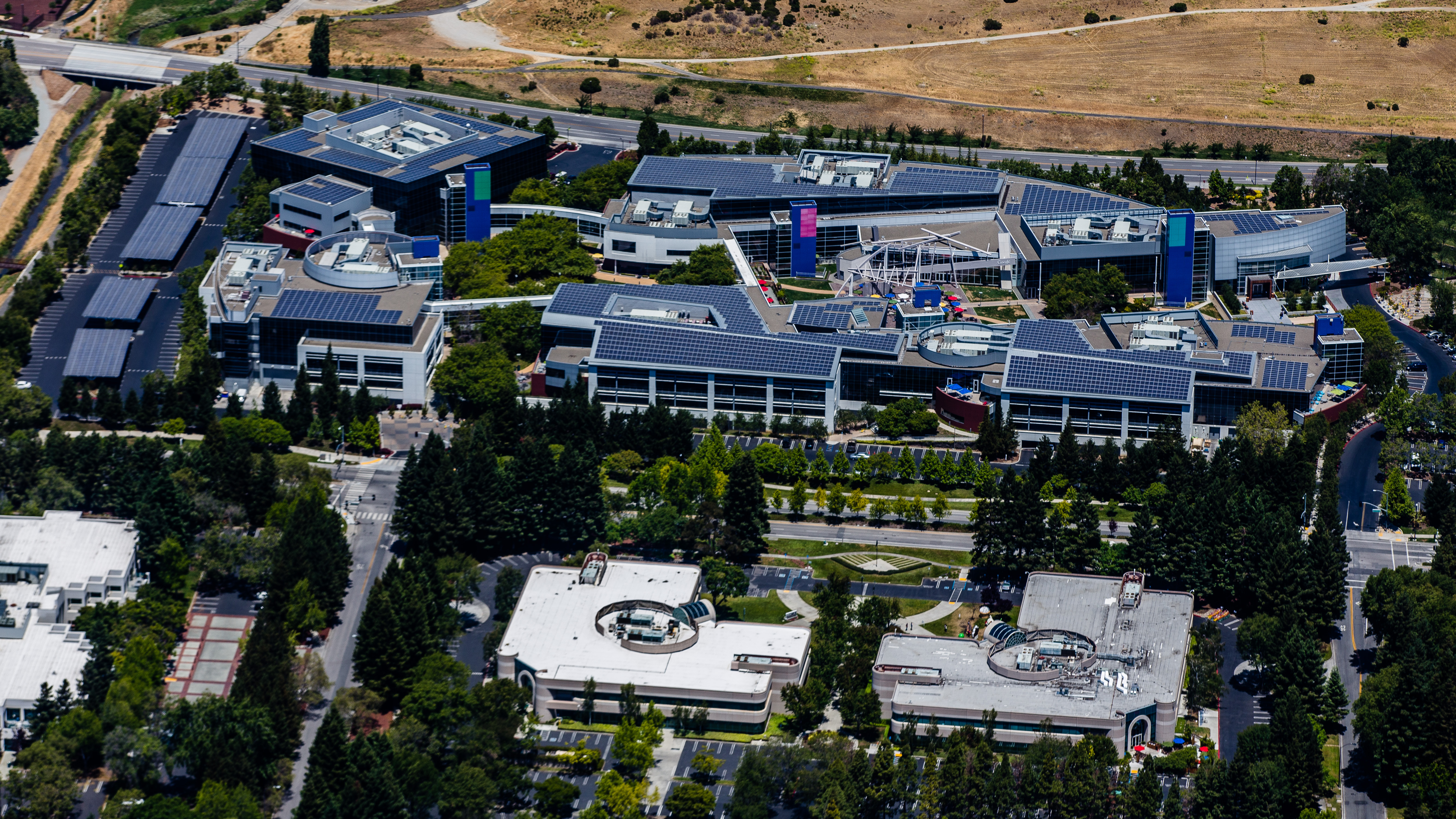
- Aerial view of Silicon Valley Stanford University Apple Park in Cupertino Downtown San Jose HP Garage in Palo Alto Googleplex in Mountain View

- Location within San Francisco Bay Area
- Coordinates: 37.404899°N 122.111118°W
- Country: United States
- State: California
- Megaregion: Northern California
- Region: San Francisco Bay Area
- Time zone: UTC−8 (Pacific)
  - Summer (DST): UTC−7 (PDT)

Silicon Valley is the first global center for high technology and innovation. It is located in Santa Clara County and southern San Mateo County within the Santa Clara Valley and the San Francisco Bay Area. Sunnyvale, Mountain View, Palo Alto and Menlo Park are frequently cited as the birthplace of Silicon Valley. Other major Silicon Valley cities are San Jose, Santa Clara, Redwood City and Cupertino.

It was in Silicon Valley that the silicon-based integrated circuit, the microprocessor, and the microcomputer, among other technologies, were developed. Today, Silicon Valley is home to many of the world's leading high-tech corporations, including the headquarters of more than 30 businesses in the Fortune 1000, and thousands of startup companies. The Bay Area also accounts for one-third of all of the venture capital investment in the United States, despite the tech ecosystem becoming more geographically dispersed. As of 2021, Santa Clara and San Mateo Counties employed about a half million information technology workers. Many headquarters of tech companies in Silicon Valley have become hotspots for tourism.

As of 2015, San Jose's metropolitan area, which comprises the bulk of Silicon Valley, had the third-highest GDP per capita in the world (after Zurich and Oslo), according to the Brookings Institution. As of June 2021, it also had the highest percentage of homes valued at $1 million or more in the United States, at 47%.

As more high-tech companies were established further north in San Francisco and the East Bay, the term "Silicon Valley" came to have a second metonymical definition referring to high-tech businesses in the entire Bay Area. The name also became a global synonym for leading high-tech research and enterprises, and thus inspired similarly named locations, as well as research parks and technology centers with comparable structures all around the world.

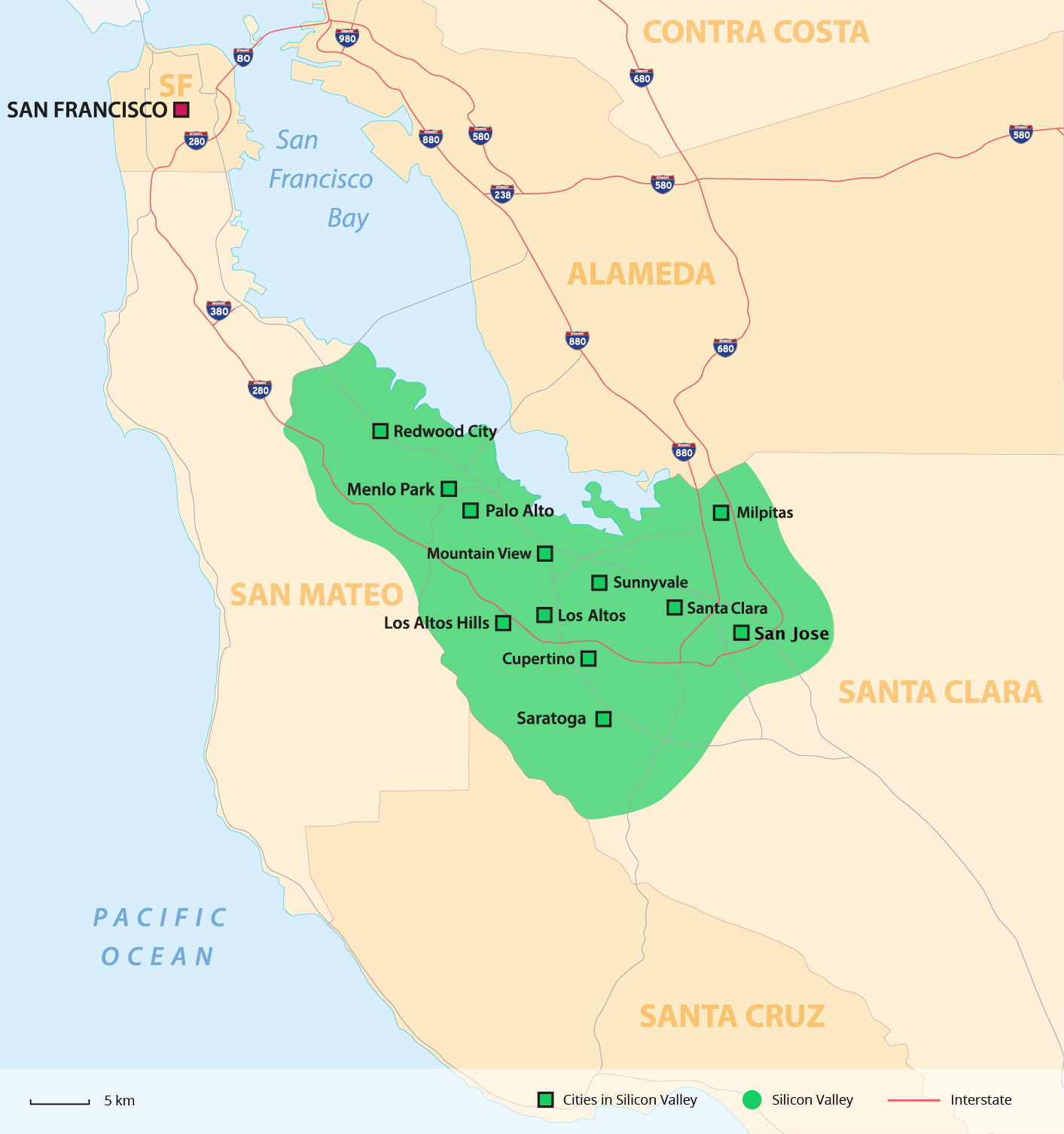
Map of Silicon Valley

== Etymology ==
"Silicon" refers to the chemical element used in silicon-based transistors and integrated circuit chips, which is the focus of a large number of computer hardware and software innovators and manufacturers in the region.

The popularization of the name is often credited to Don Hoefler, the first journalist to use the term in a news story. His article "Silicon Valley U.S.A." was published in the January 11, 1971, issue of the weekly trade newspaper Electronic News. In preparation for this report, during a lunch meeting with marketing people who were visiting the area, he heard them use the term. Earlier uses outside journalism exist; for example, a May 1970 advertisement in the Palo Alto Times described a Palo Alto company that "helps production people in Silicon Valley". It is possible that the nickname was coined by Washington, D.C.–based Department of Defense people who did business with California chip makers. However, the term did not gain widespread use until the early 1980s, at the time of the introduction of the IBM PC and numerous related hardware and software products to the consumer market.

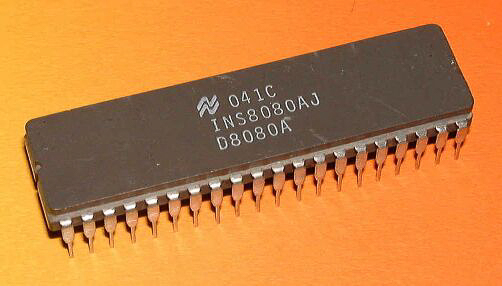
Silicon Valley derives its name from the silicon used in transistors and computer chips, pioneered in the region in the 20th century.

The urbanized area is built upon an alluvial plain within a longitudinal valley formed by roughly parallel earthquake faults. The area between the faults subsided into a graben or dropped valley. Hoefler defined Silicon Valley as the urbanized parts of "the San Francisco Peninsula and Santa Clara Valley". Before the expansive growth of the tech industry, the region had been the largest fruit-producing and packing region in the world up through the 1960s, with 39 fruit canneries. The nickname it had been known as during that period was "the Valley of Heart's Delight".

== History ==
Silicon Valley was born through the intersection of several contributing factors, including a skilled science research base housed in area universities, plentiful venture capital, permissive government regulation, and steady U.S. Department of Defense spending. Stanford University’s leadership was especially important in the Valley's early development. Together these elements formed the basis of its growth and success. The United States was more friendly than other countries to business investment, charging much lower taxes on capital gains since the Revenue Act of 1921, and featuring particularly loose free market controls over new business. In 1953, the Small Business Administration was created to foster startups, giving a boost to entrepreneurs. Northern California was even more welcoming, with a group of venture capitalists actively seeking high-tech business ideas, clustered on Sand Hill Road in Menlo Park and Palo Alto. California's civil code undermined the usual non-compete clauses that effectively tied employees to their companies in other states, allowing California workers to freely apply the knowledge they gained from their previous employer. This gave Silicon Valley an advantage over other American tech hubs such as Massachusetts Route 128 curving around Boston.

=== Early military origins ===
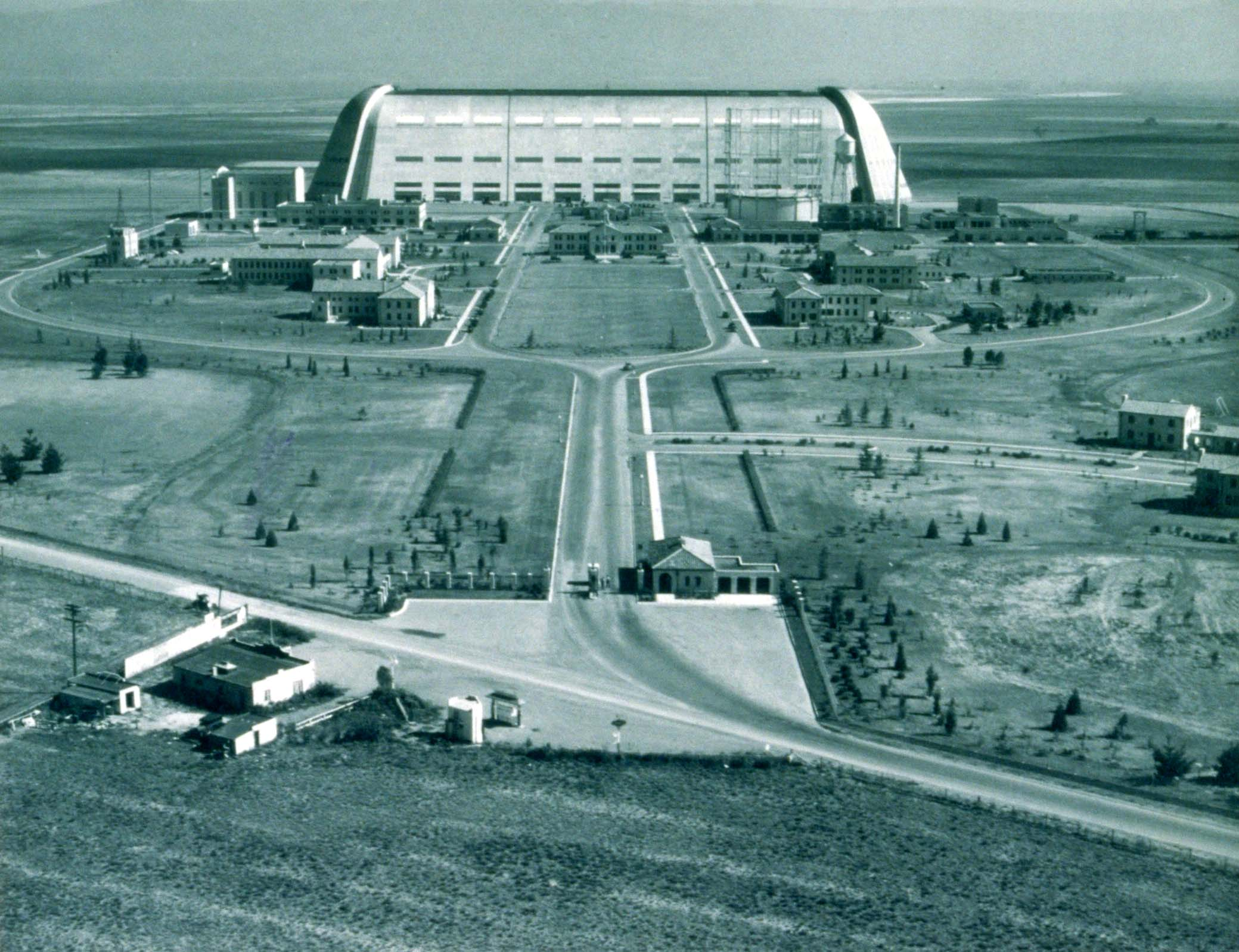
Established in 1931, Moffett Field in Sunnyvale/Mountain View has played a strategic role in Silicon Valley's evolution, researching and developing key technologies, first for the U.S. military and then for NASA. Today it hosts the Ames Research Center.

The San Francisco Bay Area had long been a major site of United States Navy research and technology. In 1909, Charles Herrold started the first radio station in the United States with regularly scheduled programming in San Jose. Later that year, Stanford University graduate Cyril Elwell purchased the U.S. patents for Poulsen arc radio transmission technology and founded the Federal Telegraph Corporation (FTC) in Palo Alto. Over the next decade, the FTC created the world's first global radio communication system, and signed a contract with the Navy in 1912.

In 1933, Air Base Sunnyvale, California, was commissioned by the United States Government for use as a Naval Air Station (NAS) to house the airship USS Macon in Hangar One. The station was renamed NAS Moffett Field, and between 1933 and 1947, U.S. Navy blimps were based there. A number of technology firms had set up shop in the area around Moffett Field to serve the Navy. When the Navy gave up its airship ambitions and moved most of its west coast operations to San Diego, the National Advisory Committee for Aeronautics (NACA, forerunner of NASA) took over portions of Moffett Field for aeronautics research. Many of the original companies stayed, while new ones moved in. The immediate area was soon filled with aerospace firms, such as Lockheed, which was the area's largest employer from the 1950s into 1980s.

=== Role of Stanford University ===
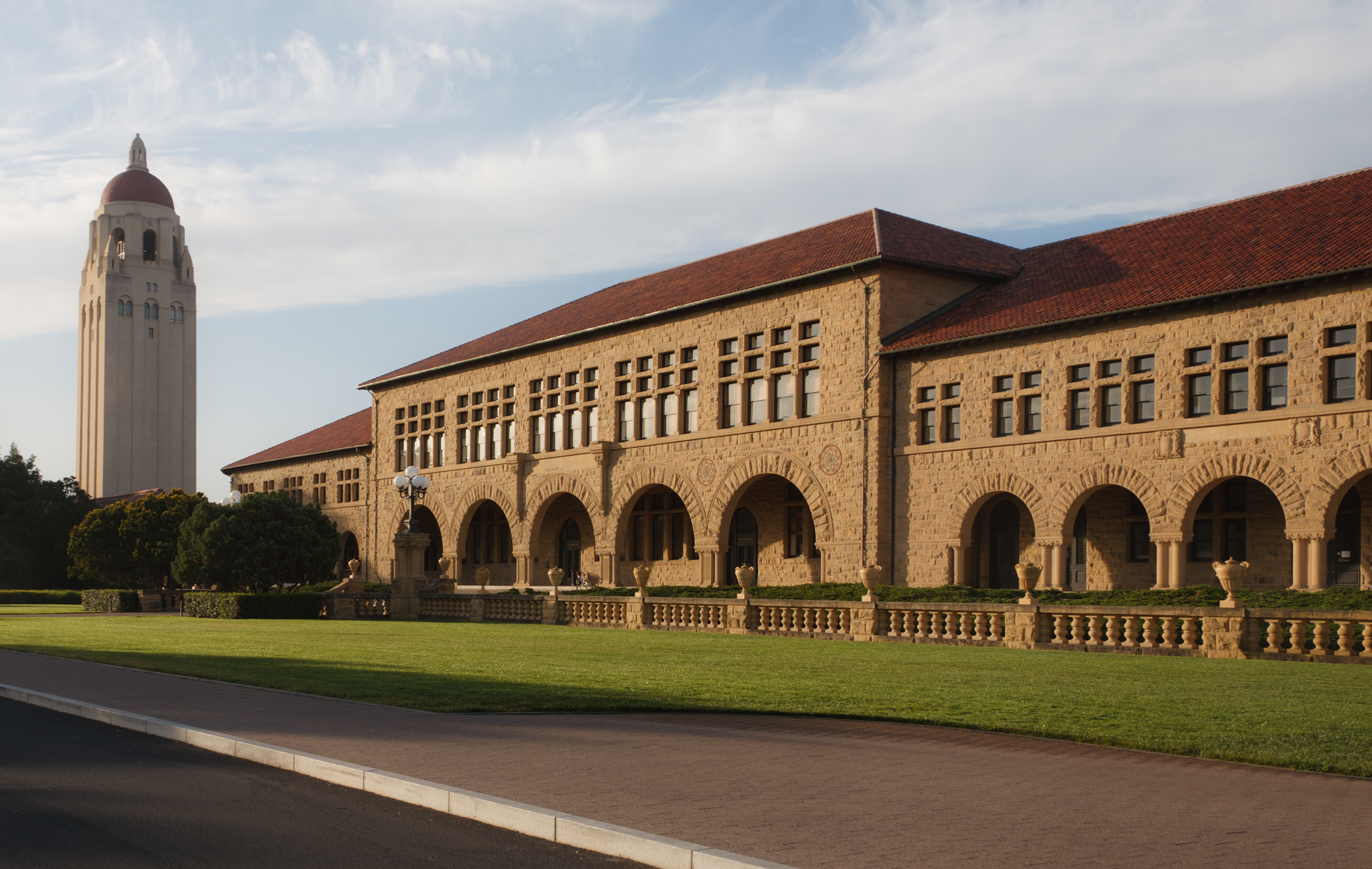
Stanford University played the central role in the emergence of Silicon Valley, both through its academic programs and through its real investments into the local tech ecosystem, such as with the Stanford Research Park.

Stanford University, its affiliates, and graduates have played a major role in the development of the culture of collaboration among high-tech companies. A powerful sense of regional solidarity shaped the outlook of inventors and engineers in California; contrasting markedly from the insular and competitive environment of engineering firms on the East Coast of the United States. From the 1890s, Stanford University's leaders saw its mission as service to the (American) West and shaped the school accordingly. At the same time, the perceived exploitation of the West at the hands of eastern interests fueled booster-like attempts to build self-sufficient local industry. Thus regionalism helped align Stanford's interests with those of the area's high-tech firms.

Frederick Terman, as Stanford University's dean of the school of engineering from 1946, encouraged faculty and graduates to start their own companies. In 1951 Terman spearheaded the formation of Stanford Industrial Park (now Stanford Research Park, an area surrounding Page Mill Road, south west of El Camino Real and extending beyond Foothill Expressway to Arastradero Road), where the university leased portions of its land to high-tech firms. Terman nurtured companies like Hewlett-Packard, Varian Associates, Eastman Kodak, General Electric, Lockheed Corporation, and other high-tech firms, until what would become Silicon Valley grew up around the Stanford University campus.

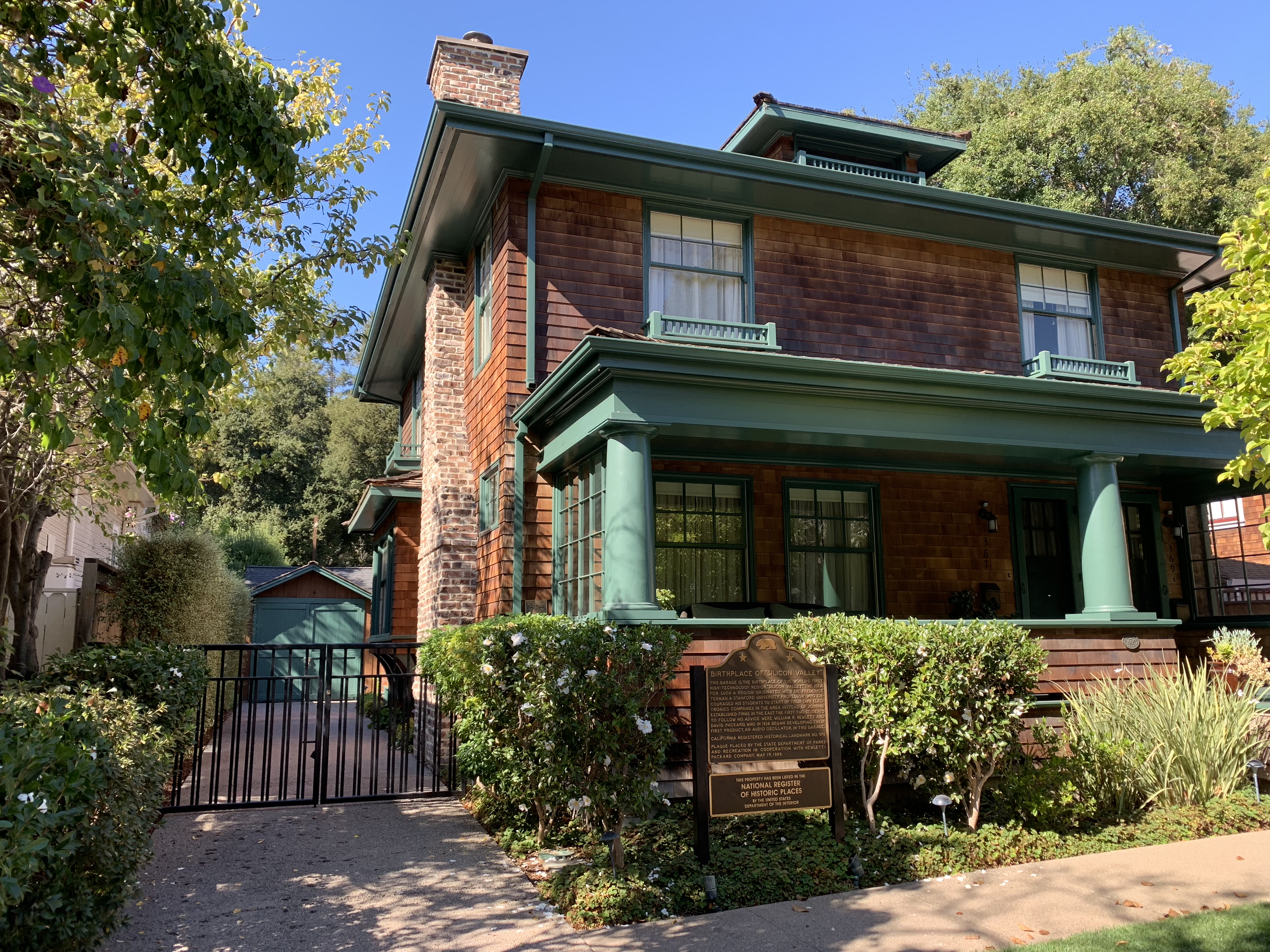
The HP Garage, dubbed the "Birthplace of Silicon Valley", where Bill Hewlett and David Packard (founders of Hewlett-Packard) began developing their audio oscillator in 1938. Their business philosophy, called The HP Way, soon spread throughout Silicon Valley.

In 1951, to address the financial demands of Stanford's growth requirements, and to provide local employment-opportunities for graduating students, Frederick Terman proposed leasing Stanford's lands for use as an office park named the Stanford Industrial Park (later Stanford Research Park). Terman invited only high-technology companies. The first tenant was Varian Associates, founded by Stanford alumni in the 1930s to build military-radar components. Terman also found venture capital for civilian-technology start-ups. Hewlett-Packard became one of the major success-stories. Founded in 1939 in Packard's garage by Stanford graduates Bill Hewlett and David Packard, Hewlett-Packard moved its offices into the Stanford Research Park shortly after 1953. In 1954 Stanford originated the Honors Cooperative Program to allow full-time employees of the companies to pursue graduate degrees from the university on a part-time basis. The initial companies signed five-year agreements in which they would pay double the tuition for each student in order to cover the costs. Hewlett-Packard has become the largest personal-computer manufacturer in the world, and transformed the home-printing market when it released the first thermal drop-on-demand ink-jet printer in 1984. Other early tenants included Eastman Kodak, General Electric, and Lockheed.

=== Rise of Silicon ===
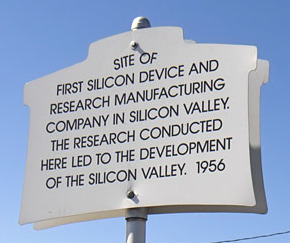
Plaque commemorating Shockley Semiconductor Laboratory as the first high-tech company in what would become Silicon Valley

In 1956, William Shockley, the co-inventor of the first working transistor (with John Bardeen and Walter Houser Brattain), moved from New Jersey to Mountain View, California, to start Shockley Semiconductor Laboratory to live closer to his mother May in Palo Alto. Shockley's work served as the basis for many electronic developments for decades. Both Frederick Terman and William Shockley are often called "the father of Silicon Valley". Unlike many other researchers who used germanium as the semiconductor material, Shockley believed that silicon was the better material for making transistors. Shockley intended to replace the current transistor with a new three-element design (today known as the Shockley diode), but the design was considerably more difficult to build than the "simple" transistor. In 1957, Shockley decided to end research on the silicon transistor. As a result of Shockley's abusive management style, eight engineers left the company to form Fairchild Semiconductor; Shockley referred to them as the "traitorous eight". Two of the original employees of Fairchild Semiconductor, Robert Noyce and Gordon Moore, would go on to found Intel.

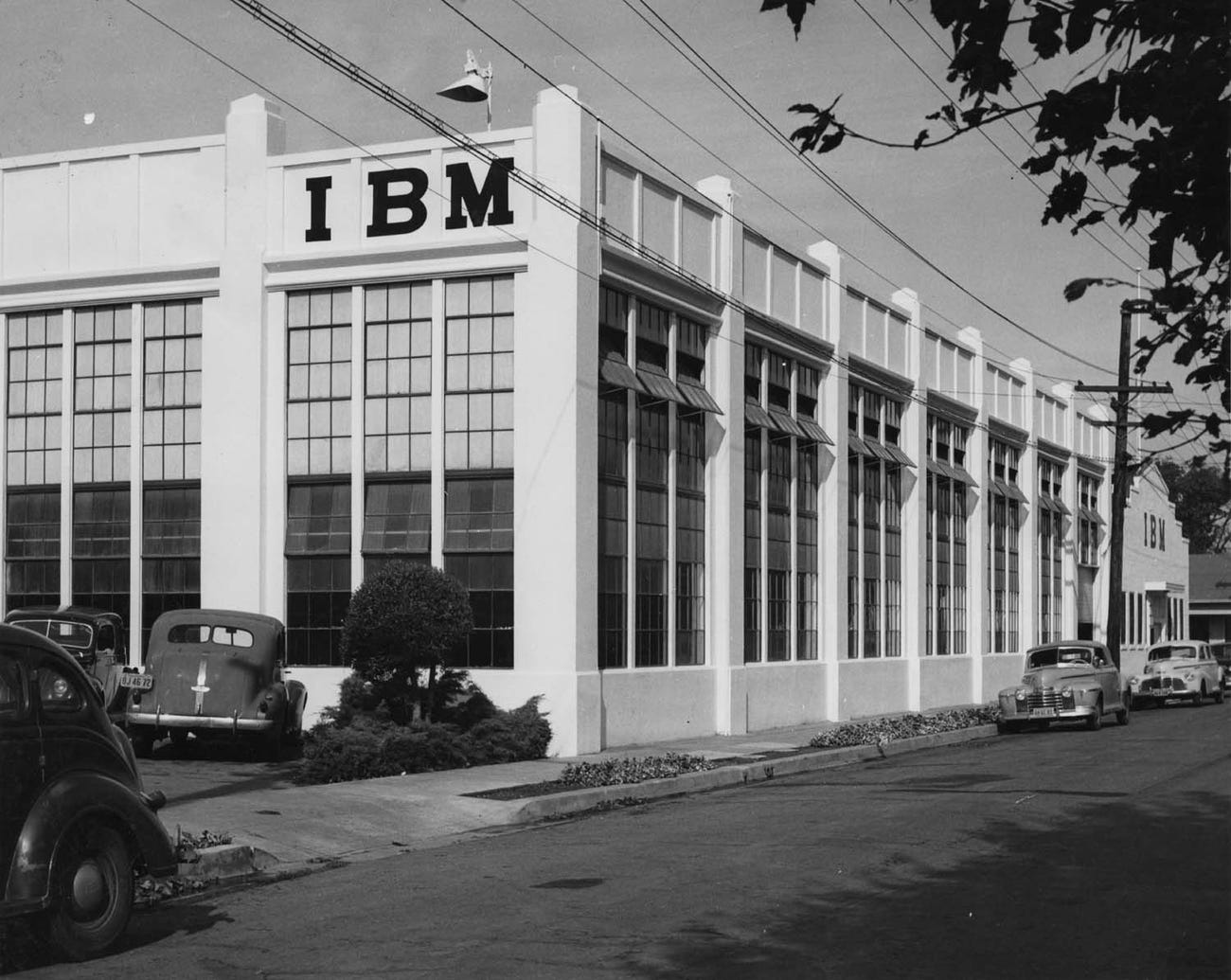
The first IBM plant in California, established in San Jose in 1943

Following the 1959 inventions of the monolithic integrated circuit (IC) chip by Robert Noyce at Fairchild, the first commercial MOS IC was introduced by General Microelectronics in 1964. The first single-chip microprocessor was the Intel 4004, designed and realized by Federico Faggin along with Ted Hoff, Masatoshi Shima and Stanley Mazor at Intel in 1971. In April 1974, Intel released the Intel 8080, the second 8-bit microprocessor designed and manufactured by Intel.

=== Origins of the Internet ===
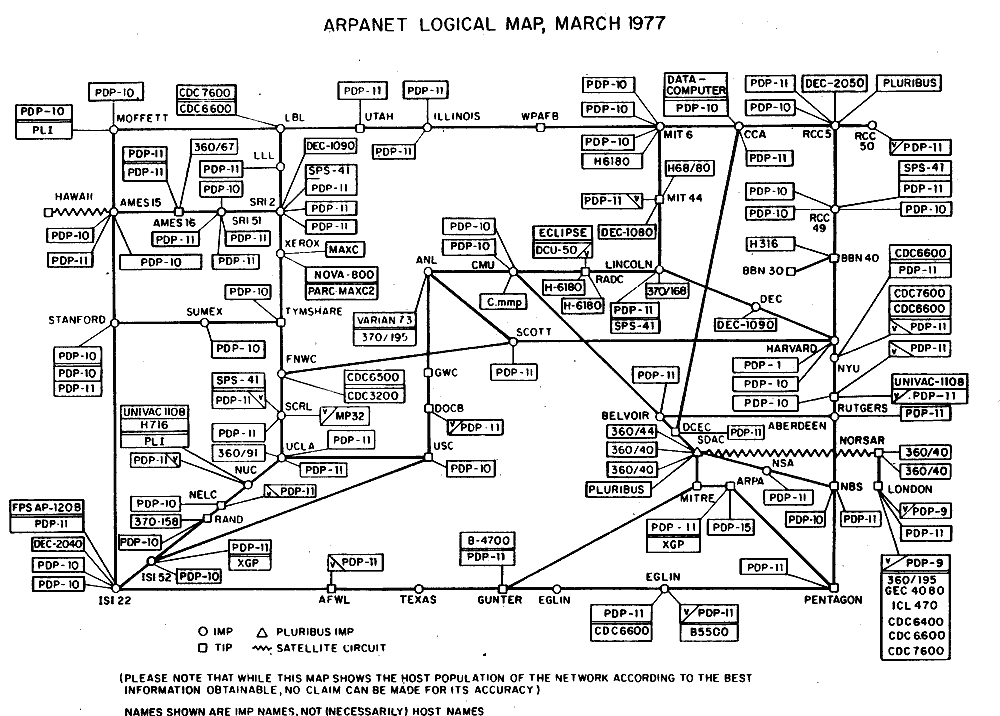
ARPANET, the predecessor to the Internet, began to be developed in 1966 by the U.S. Department of Defense and four research universities in California, including Stanford.

On April 23, 1963, J. C. R. Licklider, the first director of the Information Processing Techniques Office (IPTO) at The Pentagon's ARPA issued an office memorandum addressed to Members and Affiliates of the Intergalactic Computer Network. It rescheduled a meeting in Palo Alto regarding his vision of a computer network, which he imagined as an electronic commons open to all, the main and essential medium of informational interaction for governments, institutions, corporations, and individuals. As head of IPTO from 1962 to 1964, "Licklider initiated three of the most important developments in information technology: the creation of computer science departments at several major universities, time-sharing, and networking." In 1969, the Stanford Research Institute (now SRI International), operated one of the four original nodes that comprised ARPANET, predecessor to the Internet.

=== Emergence of venture capital ===
By the early 1970s, there were many semiconductor companies in the area, computer firms using their devices, and programming and service companies serving both. Industrial space was plentiful and housing was still inexpensive. Growth during this era was fueled by the emergence of venture capital on Sand Hill Road, beginning with Kleiner Perkins and Sequoia Capital in 1972; the availability of venture capital exploded after the successful $1.3 billion IPO of Apple Computer in December 1980. Since the 1980s, Silicon Valley has been home to the largest concentration of venture capital firms in the world.

In 1971, Don Hoefler traced the origins of Silicon Valley firms, including via investments from Fairchild's eight co-founders. The key investors in Kleiner Perkins and Sequoia Capital were from the same group, directly leading to Tech Crunch 2014 estimate of 92 public firms of 130 related listed firms then worth over US$2.1 trillion with over 2,000 firms traced back to them.

=== Banking ===
Another important pillar of the Valley's success was Silicon Valley Bank (SVB), founded in 1983 by a group of former Bank of America executives. Before its 2023 collapse, SVB specialized in providing banking services to Silicon Valley entrepreneurs and their startup firms. SVB's original primary commercial lending product was a working capital line of credit, secured by a startup's accounts receivable. In contrast to traditional banks, who focused their commercial lending on already-established businesses, SVB specialized in lending money to small startup companies in the "preprofit" stage.

=== Lawyers and law firms ===
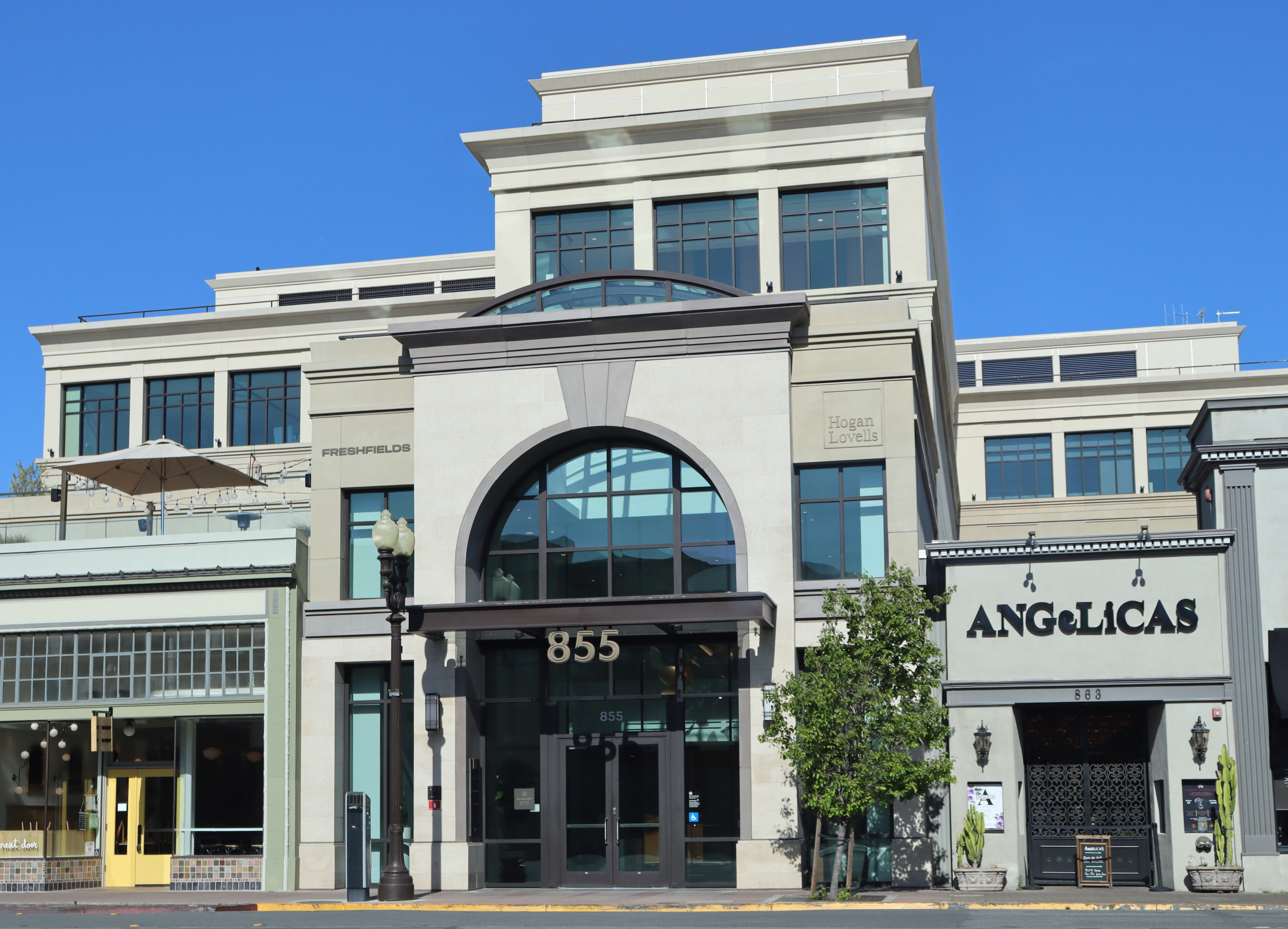
As of 2025, this Redwood City, California office building was home to the Silicon Valley branch offices of large law firms Hogan Lovells and Freshfields Bruckhaus Deringer

Prior to 1970, most Northern California lawyers were based in San Francisco, especially the experienced patent attorneys whom the high-tech industry needed to protect its intellectual property. During the 1970s, lawyers began to follow venture capitalists down the Peninsula to serve the booming high-tech industry in Silicon Valley. As of 1999, there were 2,400 lawyers practicing law in Palo Alto, a city of only 50,000 people, "the densest concentration of lawyers" in the United States outside of Washington, D.C.

By 2000, a number of large international law firms had established offices in the mid-Peninsula region, including locations on or near Sand Hill Road. Silicon Valley law firms were also among the early legal services employers to adopt business casual attire. During this period, lawyers increasingly took on roles beyond intellectual property matters, including advising businesses, facilitating transactions, and connecting entrepreneurs with other participants in the Silicon Valley startup ecosystem.

As of 2023, the San Jose-Sunnyvale-Santa Clara metropolitan area had the highest average wage for lawyers in the United States, at $268,570. Above the Law occasionally publishes lists of top-performing Silicon Valley law firms, which it calls the "white sandal elite", a parody of the "white-shoe firm" descriptor traditionally applied to certain East Coast professional services firms.

=== Rise of computer culture ===
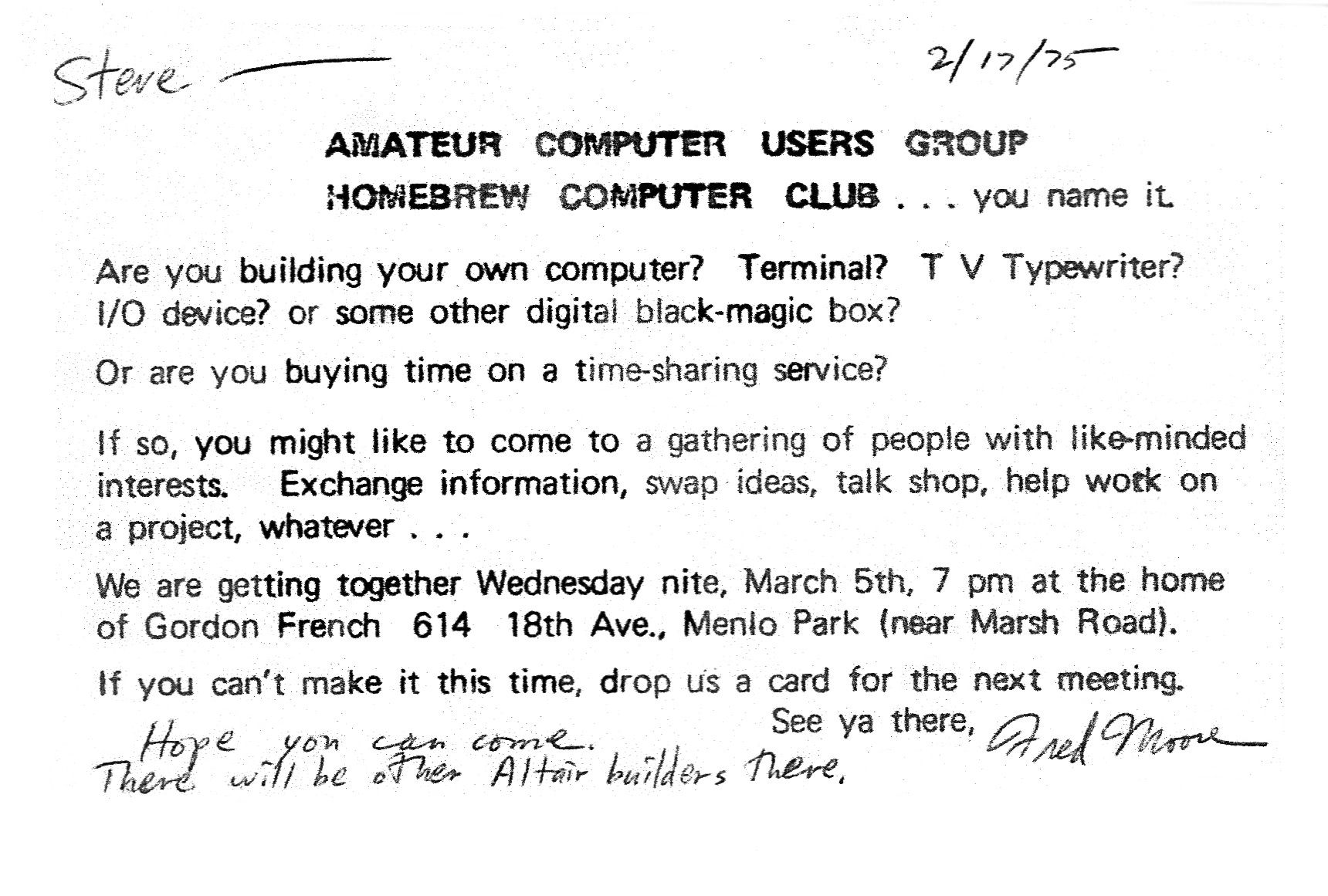
The Homebrew Computer Club was a highly influential computer hobbyist group in the 1970s and 80s that produced many influential tech founders, like Steve Jobs and Steve Wozniak. Pictured is the invitation to its first meeting in 1975.

The Homebrew Computer Club was an informal group of electronic enthusiasts and technically minded hobbyists who gathered to trade parts, circuits, and information pertaining to DIY construction of computing devices. It was started by Gordon French and Fred Moore who met at the Community Computer Center in Menlo Park. They both were interested in maintaining a regular, open forum for people to get together to work on making computers more accessible to everyone.

The first meeting was held as of March 1975 at French's garage in Menlo Park, San Mateo County, California; which was on occasion of the arrival of the MITS Altair microcomputer, the first unit sent to the area for review by People's Computer Company. Steve Wozniak and Steve Jobs credit that first meeting with inspiring them to design the original Apple I and (successor) Apple II computers. As a result, the first preview of the Apple I was given at the Homebrew Computer Club. Subsequent meetings were held at an auditorium at the Stanford Linear Accelerator Center.

=== Advent of software ===
Although semiconductors are still a major component of the area's economy, Silicon Valley has been most famous in recent years for innovations in software and Internet services. Silicon Valley has significantly influenced computer operating systems, software, and user interfaces. Using money from NASA, the US Air Force, and ARPA, Douglas Engelbart invented the mouse and hypertext-based collaboration tools in the mid-1960s and 1970s while at Stanford Research Institute (now SRI International), first publicly demonstrated in 1968 in what is now known as The Mother of All Demos.

Engelbart's Augmentation Research Center at SRI was also involved in launching the ARPANET (precursor to the Internet) and starting the Network Information Center (now InterNIC). Xerox hired some of Engelbart's best researchers beginning in the early 1970s. In turn, in the 1970s and 1980s, Xerox's Palo Alto Research Center (PARC) played a pivotal role in object-oriented programming, graphical user interfaces (GUIs), Ethernet, PostScript, and laser printers.

While Xerox marketed equipment using its technologies, for the most part its technologies flourished elsewhere. The diaspora of Xerox inventions led directly to 3Com and Adobe Systems, and indirectly to Cisco, Apple Computer, and Microsoft. Apple's Macintosh GUI was largely a result of Steve Jobs' visit to PARC and the subsequent hiring of key personnel. Cisco's impetus stemmed from the need to route a variety of protocols over Stanford University's Ethernet campus network.

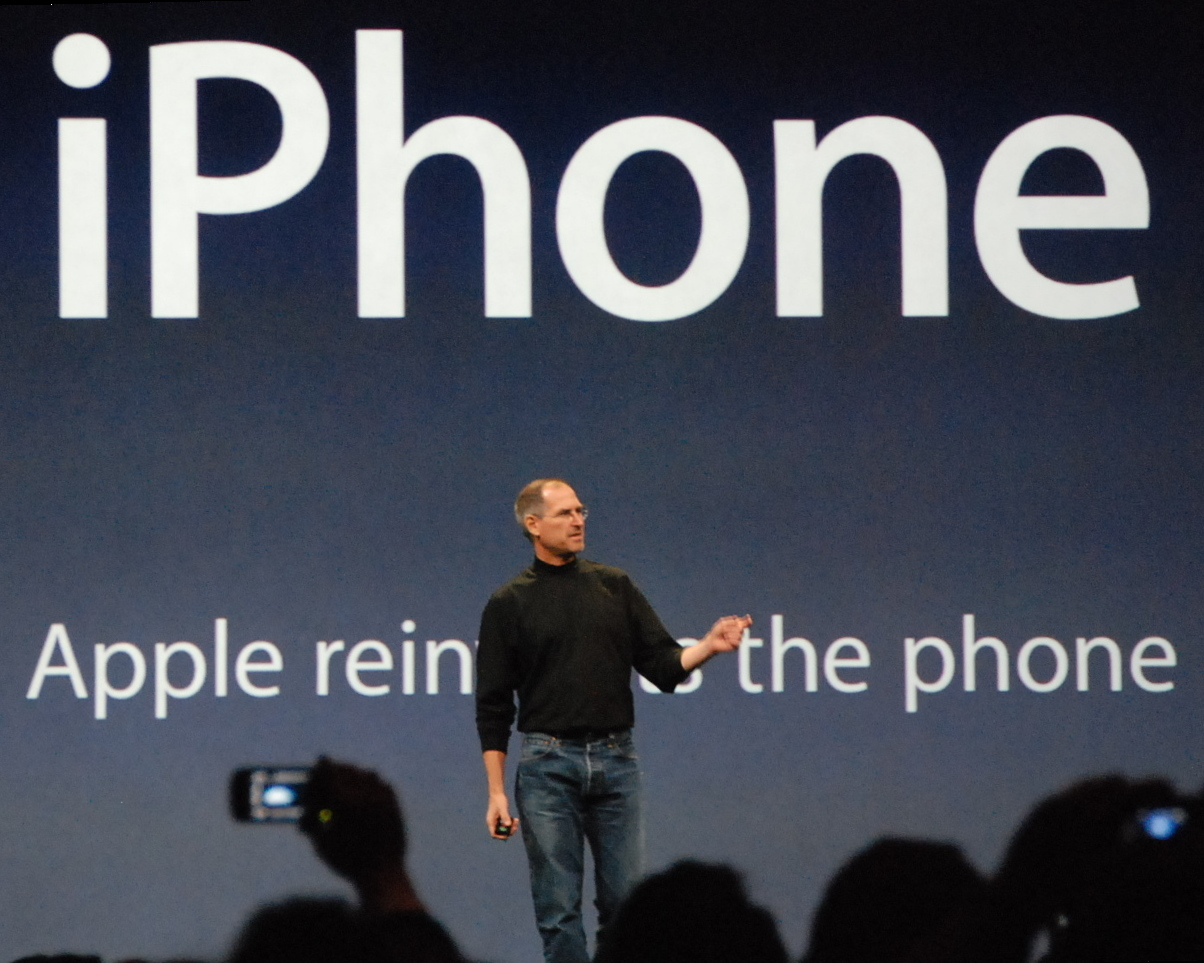
Apple founder Steve Jobs introducing the iPhone in 2007

=== Internet age ===
Commercial use of the Internet became practical and grew slowly throughout the early 1990s. In 1995, commercial use of the Internet grew substantially and the initial wave of internet startups, Amazon.com, eBay, and the predecessor to Craigslist began operations. Silicon Valley is generally considered to have been the center of the dot-com bubble, which started in the mid-1990s and collapsed after the NASDAQ stock market began to decline dramatically in April 2000. During the bubble era, real estate prices reached unprecedented levels. For a brief time, Sand Hill Road was home to the most expensive commercial real estate in the world, and the booming economy resulted in severe traffic congestion.

The PayPal Mafia is sometimes credited with inspiring the re-emergence of consumer-focused Internet companies after the dot-com bust of 2001. After the dot-com crash, Silicon Valley continues to maintain its status as one of the top research and development centers in the world. A 2006 The Wall Street Journal story found that 12 of the 20 most inventive towns in America were in California, and 10 of those were in Silicon Valley. San Jose led the list with 3,867 utility patents filed in 2005, and number two was Sunnyvale, at 1,881 utility patents. Silicon Valley is also home to a significant number of "Unicorn" ventures, referring to startup companies whose valuation has exceeded $1 billion dollars.

== Economy ==
Map of High-Tech Employment in the Bay Area

The San Francisco Bay Area has the largest concentration of high-tech companies in the United States. Largely a result of the high technology sector, the San Jose-Sunnyvale-Santa Clara Metropolitan Statistical Area has the most millionaires and the most billionaires in the United States per capita, although the venture capital ecosystem has grown more geographically decentralized over time.

Silicon Valley was the biggest high-tech manufacturing center in the United States as of 2008. The unemployment rate of the region was 9.4% in January 2009 and has decreased to a record low of 2.7% as of August 2019. Silicon Valley received 41% of all U.S. venture investment in 2011, and 46% in 2012. During the period from 2019 to 2021, the Bay Area's share of U.S. venture capital investment dropped to 35.9%, but had surged back to 41% as of the first quarter of 2023.

More traditional industries also recognize the potential of high-tech development, and several car manufacturers have opened offices in Silicon Valley to capitalize on its entrepreneurial ecosystem. Manufacture of transistors was for a long time the core industry in Silicon Valley. The workforce was for the most part composed of Asian and Latino immigrants who were paid low wages and worked in hazardous conditions due to the chemicals used in the manufacture of integrated circuits. Technical, engineering, design, and administrative staffs were in large part well compensated.

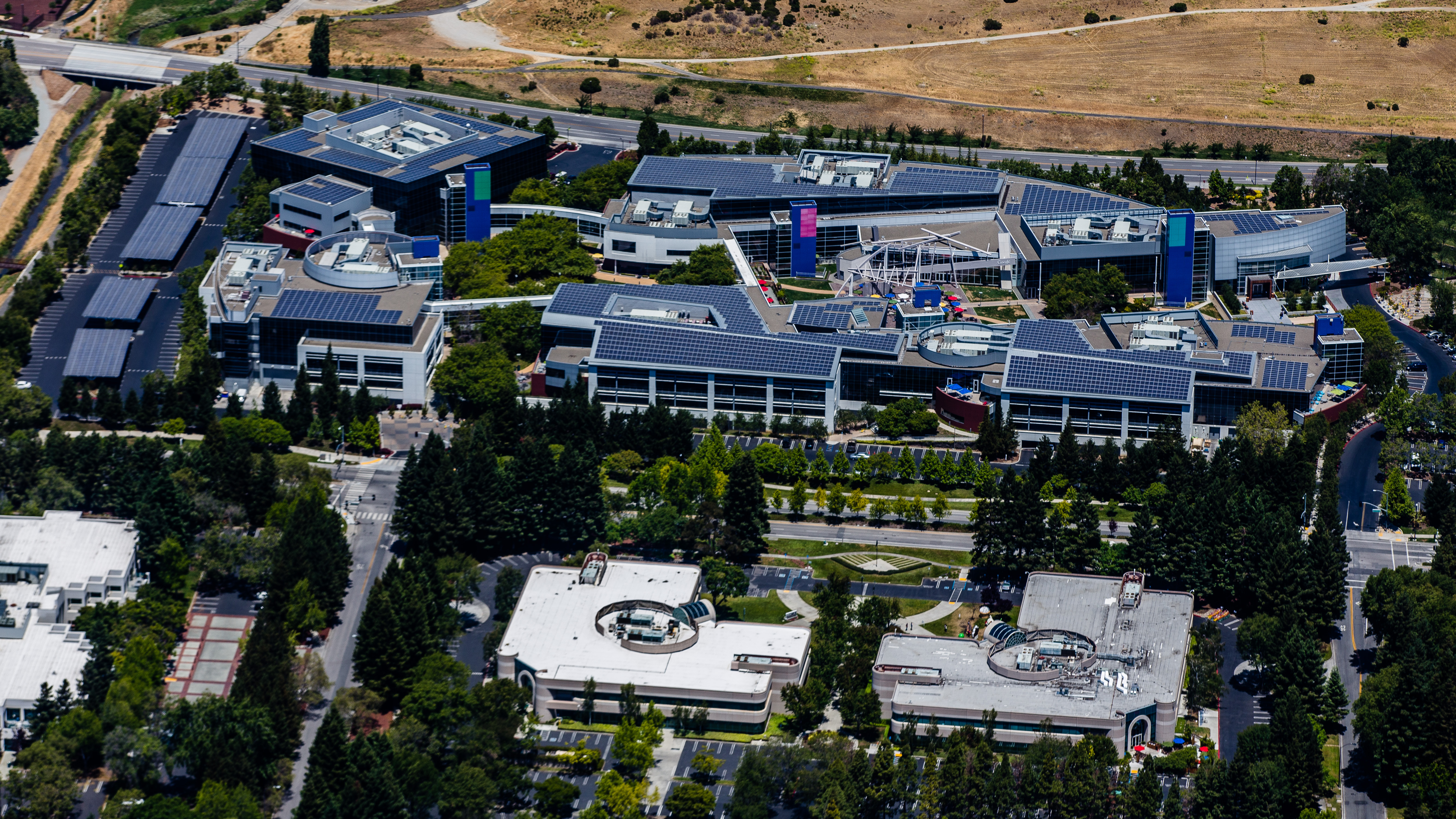
Googleplex in Mountain View

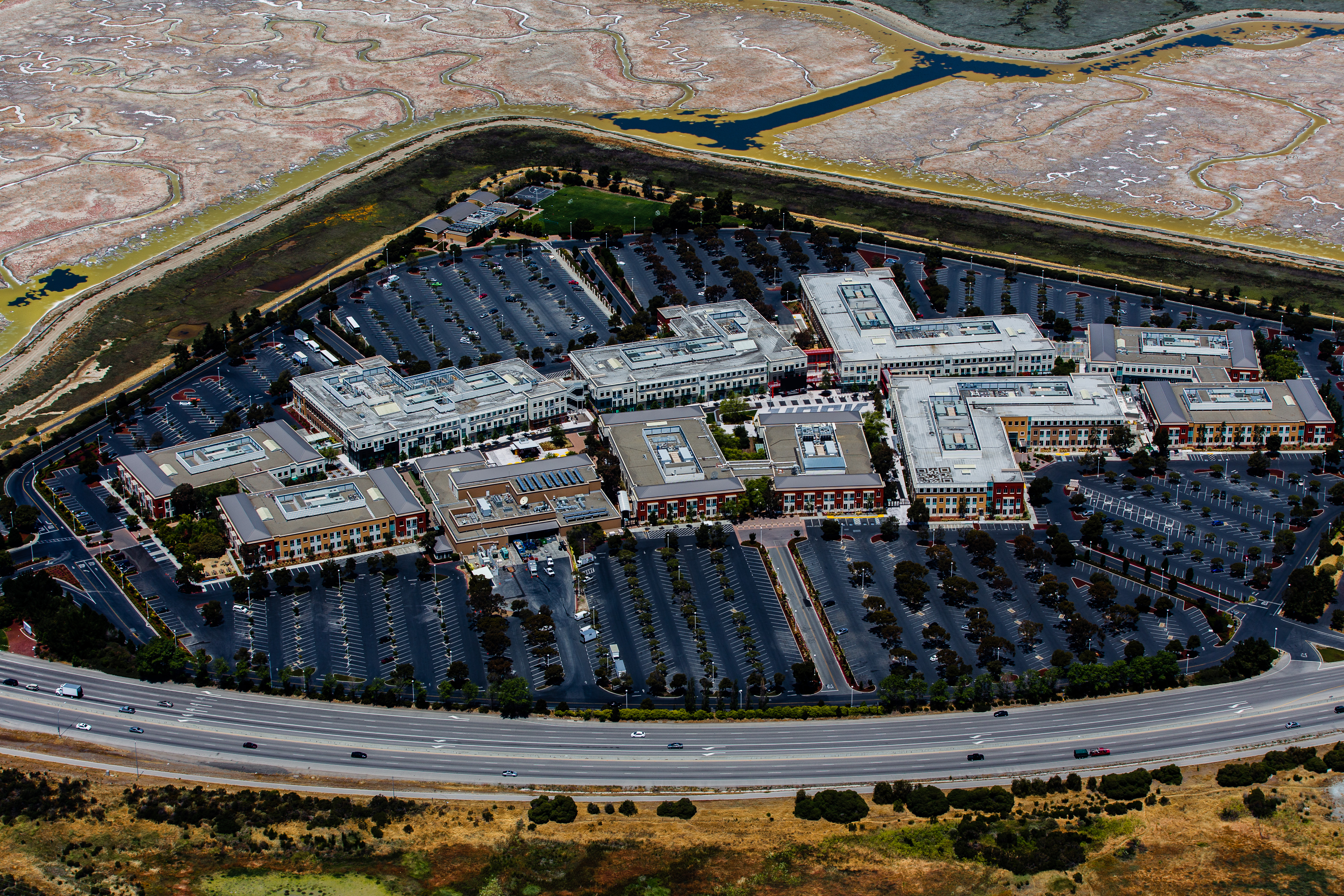
Meta Platforms in Menlo Park

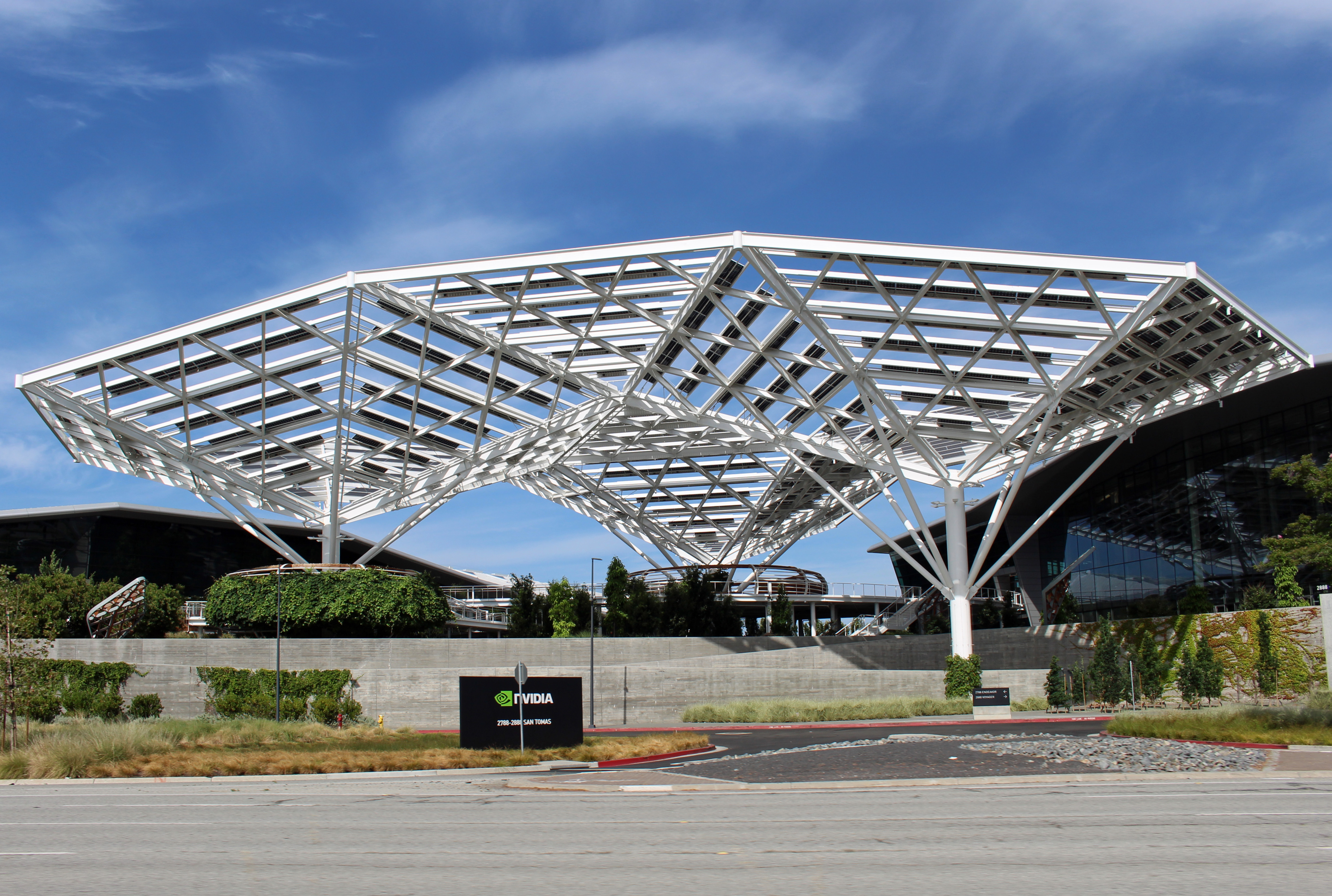
Nvidia in Santa Clara

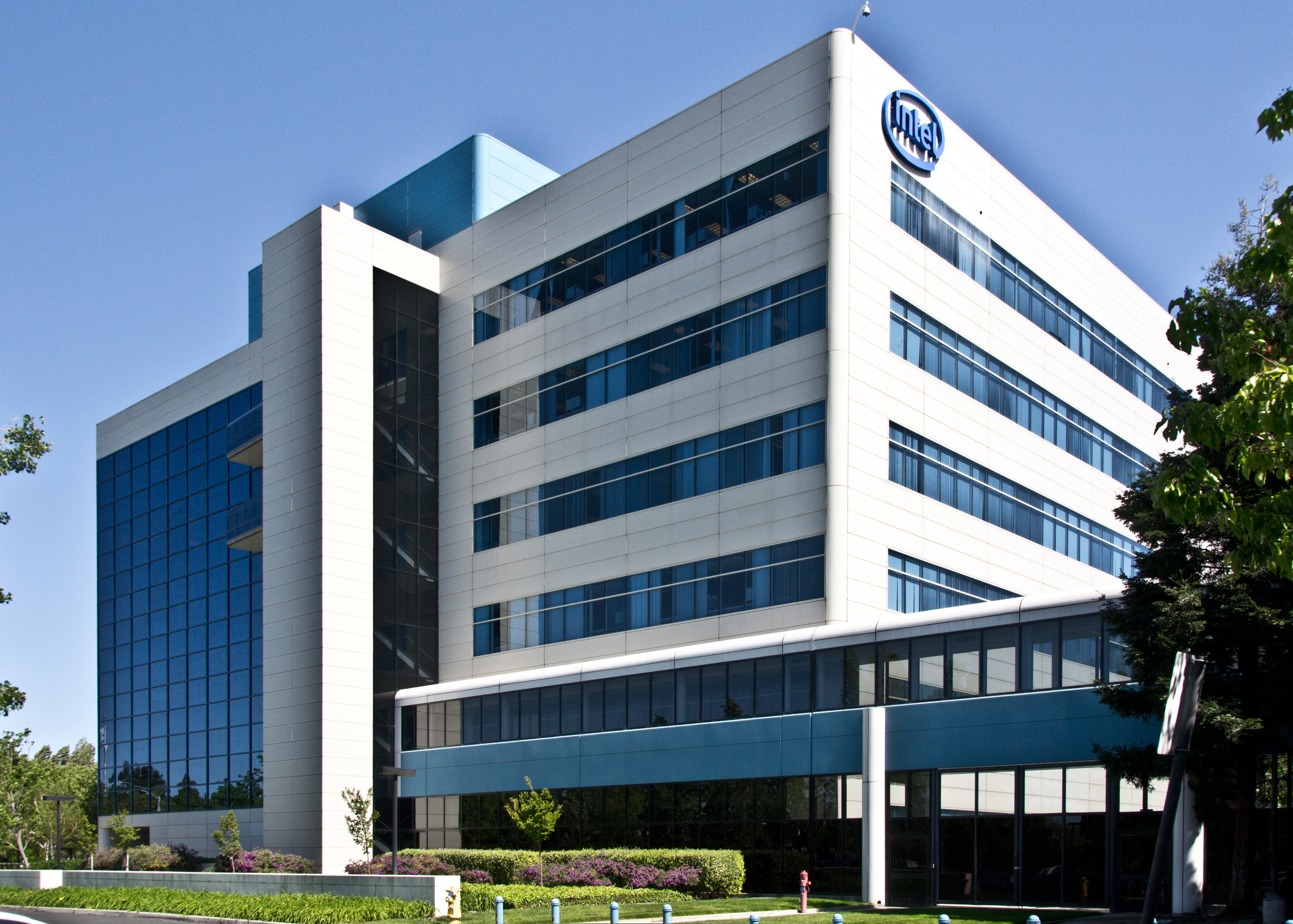
Intel in Santa Clara

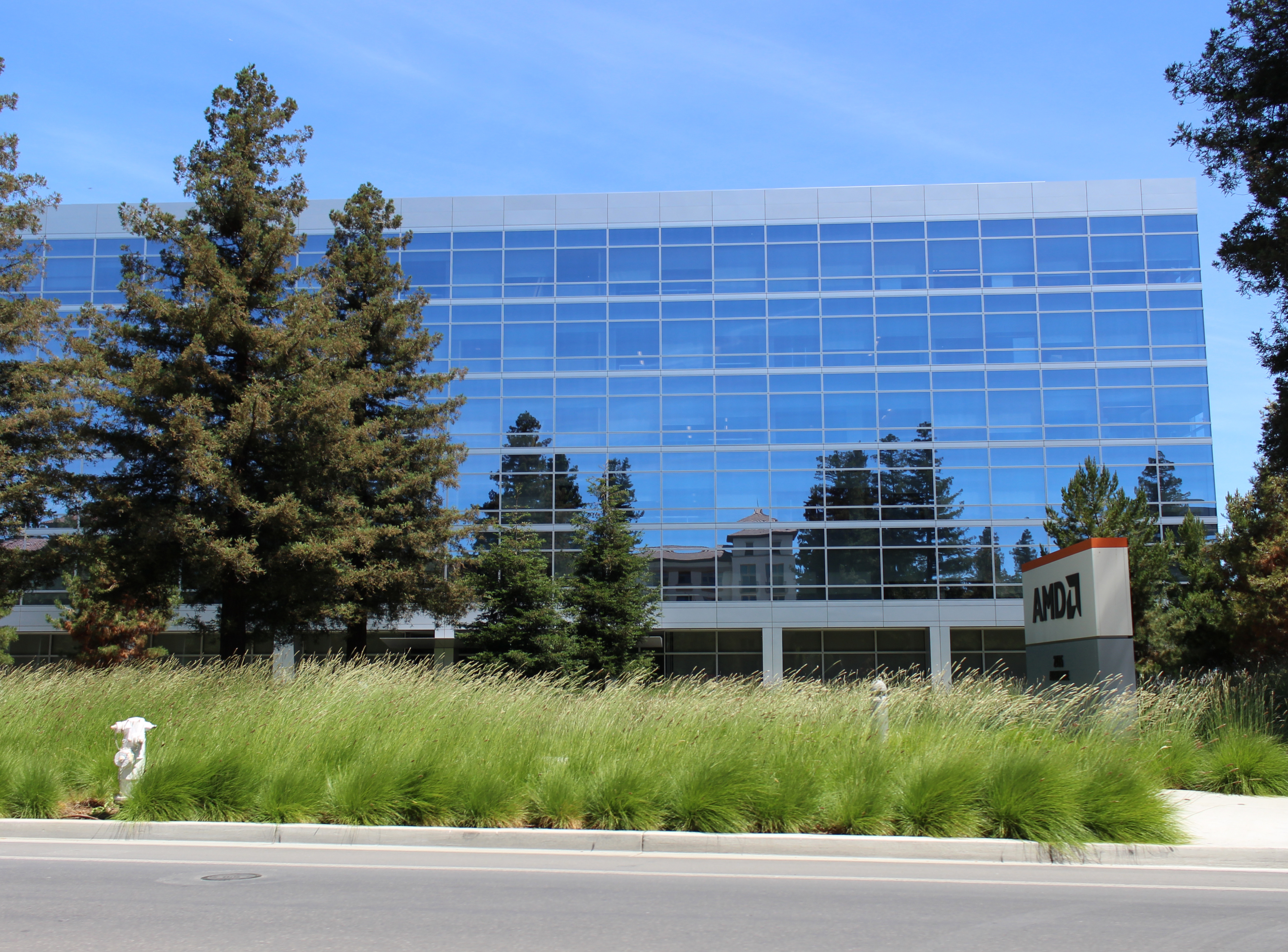
AMD in Santa Clara

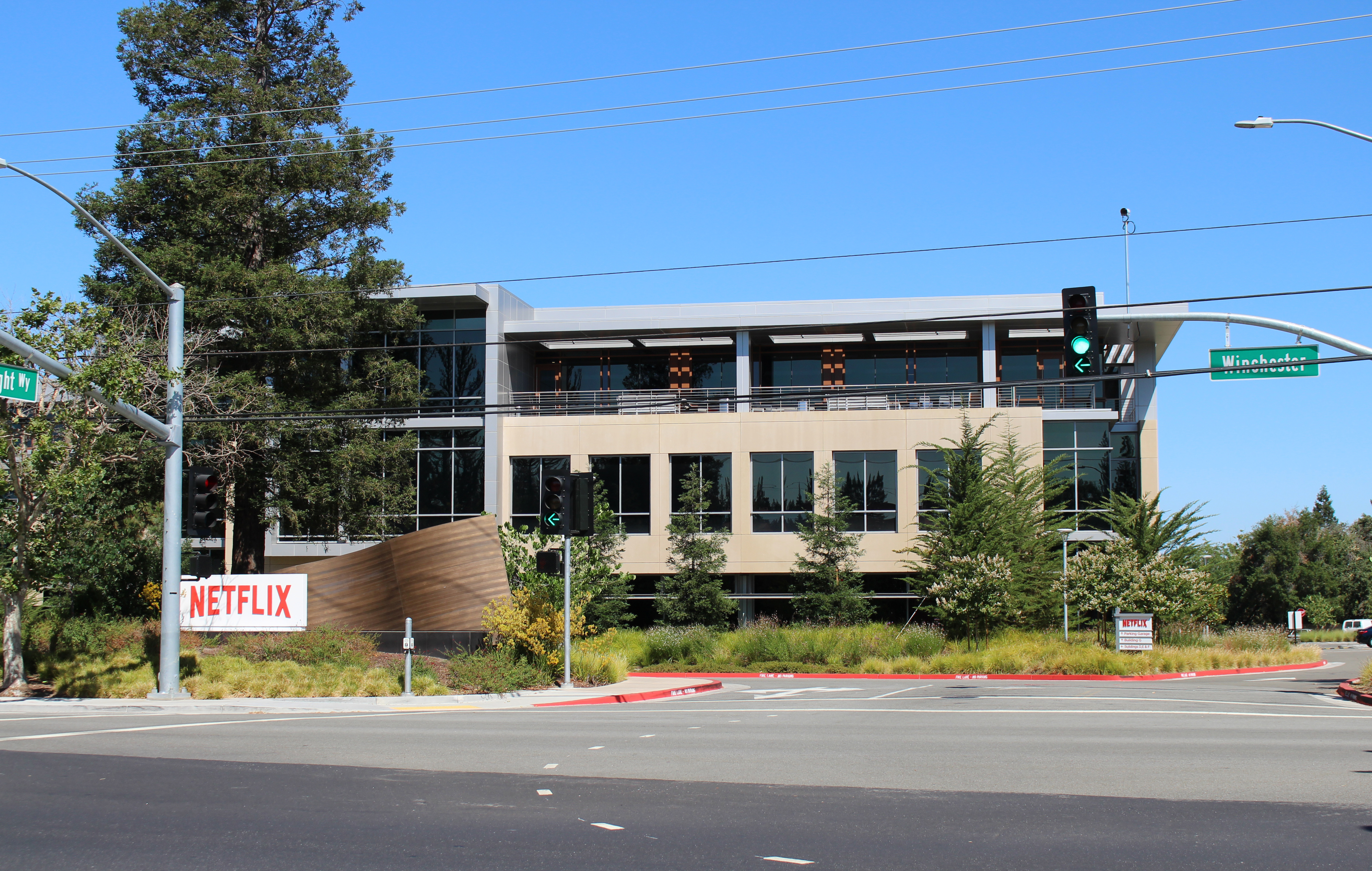
Netflix in Los Gatos

=== Housing ===
Silicon Valley has a severe housing shortage, caused by the market imbalance between jobs created and housing units built: from 2010 to 2015, many more jobs have been created than housing units built. (400,000 jobs, 60,000 housing units) This shortage has driven home prices extremely high, far out of the range of production workers. As of 2016 a two-bedroom apartment rented for about $2,500 while the median home price was about $1 million. The Financial Post called Silicon Valley the most expensive U.S. housing region. Homelessness is a problem with housing beyond the reach of middle-income residents; there is little shelter space other than in San Jose which, as of 2015, was making an effort to develop shelters by renovating old hotels.

The Economist also attributes the high cost of living to the success of the industries in this region. Although, this rift between high and low salaries is driving many residents out who can no longer afford to live there. In the Bay Area, the number of residents planning to leave within the next several years has had an increase of 35% since 2016, from 34% to 46%.

=== Wealth ===
The wealth inequality in Silicon Valley is more pronounced than in any other region of the United States. A 2023 report found that the aggregate household wealth of Silicon Valley (including ultra-high net worth individuals) was nearly $1.1 trillion, and less than 1% of the Valley's population held 36% of the wealth. Conversely, as of 2021, 23% of residents were living below the poverty line. However, the meaning of the term "poverty" is dependent upon context; in Silicon Valley, it means something different because of the region's severe housing shortage and high housing prices. As of 2023, the low-income poverty threshold set by the California Department of Housing and Community Development for single-person households in the counties of San Francisco, San Mateo, and Marin was $104,400, followed by $96,000 for the county of Santa Clara. In contrast, the 2023 national low-income poverty threshold set by the U.S. Census Bureau for a single-person household was $14,891.

=== Layoffs and economic growth ===
Although Silicon Valley's economy grew through much of the early 2020s, the region's tech industry went through a long stretch of layoffs starting in 2022 that continued well into the mid-2020s. None of this pushed the region into a recession. The 2026 Silicon Valley Index, an annual report put out by Joint Venture Silicon Valley using Bureau of Labor Statistics data, put regional unemployment at around 3.8 to 3.9 percent, while venture capital investment reached $92 billion and companies filed over 23,000 new patents that year. San José Spotlight described this as a 'paradox,' quoting Joint Venture president Russell Hancock's observation that the region's innovation and investment weren't translating into more jobs, a break from past downturns in which layoffs and rising unemployment usually moved together.

=== AI and entry-level hiring ===
Part of this shift has been linked to artificial intelligence, though not through widespread job cuts. A 2025 study from Stanford's Digital Economy Lab found no evidence of broad AI-driven job losses, but it did find a gap among younger workers: employment for people aged 22 to 25 in AI-exposed jobs, such as software engineering and customer service, was about 19 percent below what would be expected based on hiring trends for older, less exposed workers. The researchers linked this to companies hiring fewer entry-level employees rather than laying off existing staff, suggesting AI may be narrowing entry points into the tech industry for recent graduates even as overall employment numbers stay steady. This has added to a longer-running pattern in Silicon Valley, where more of the region's income comes from asset ownership than wages, a dynamic also discussed in relation to the area's hourglass economy.

=== Notable companies ===
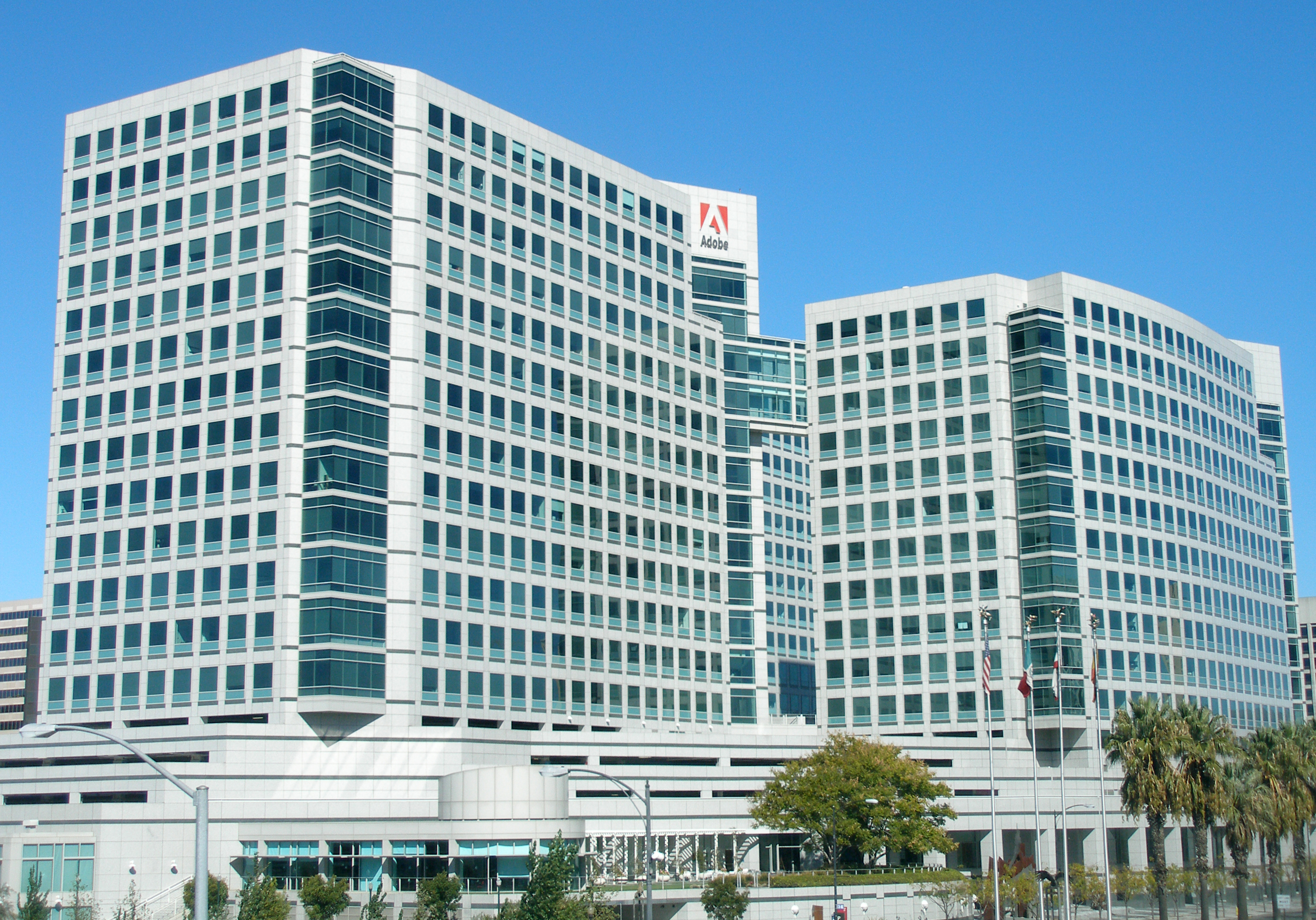
Adobe World Headquarters in Downtown San Jose

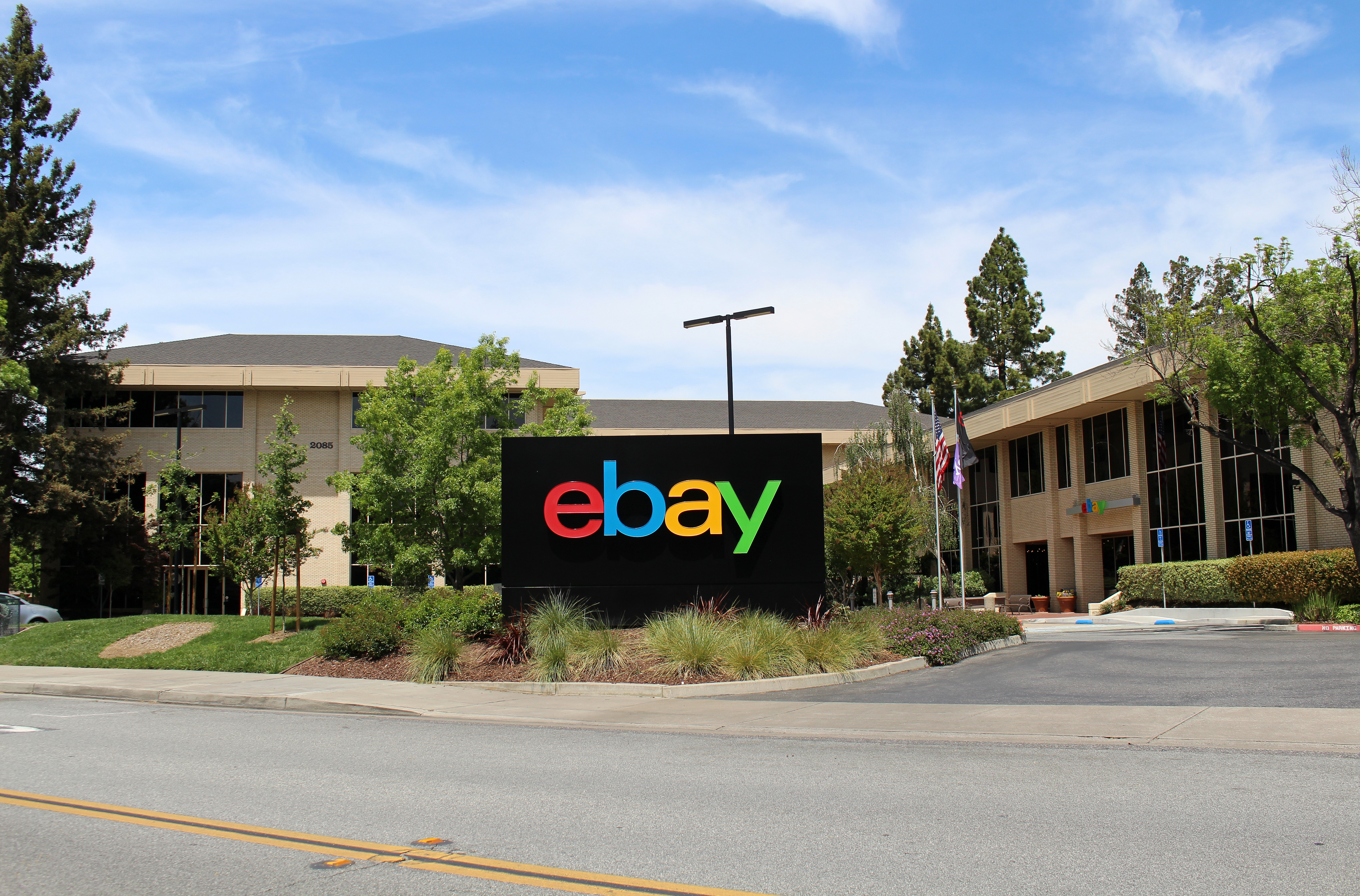
eBay in San Jose

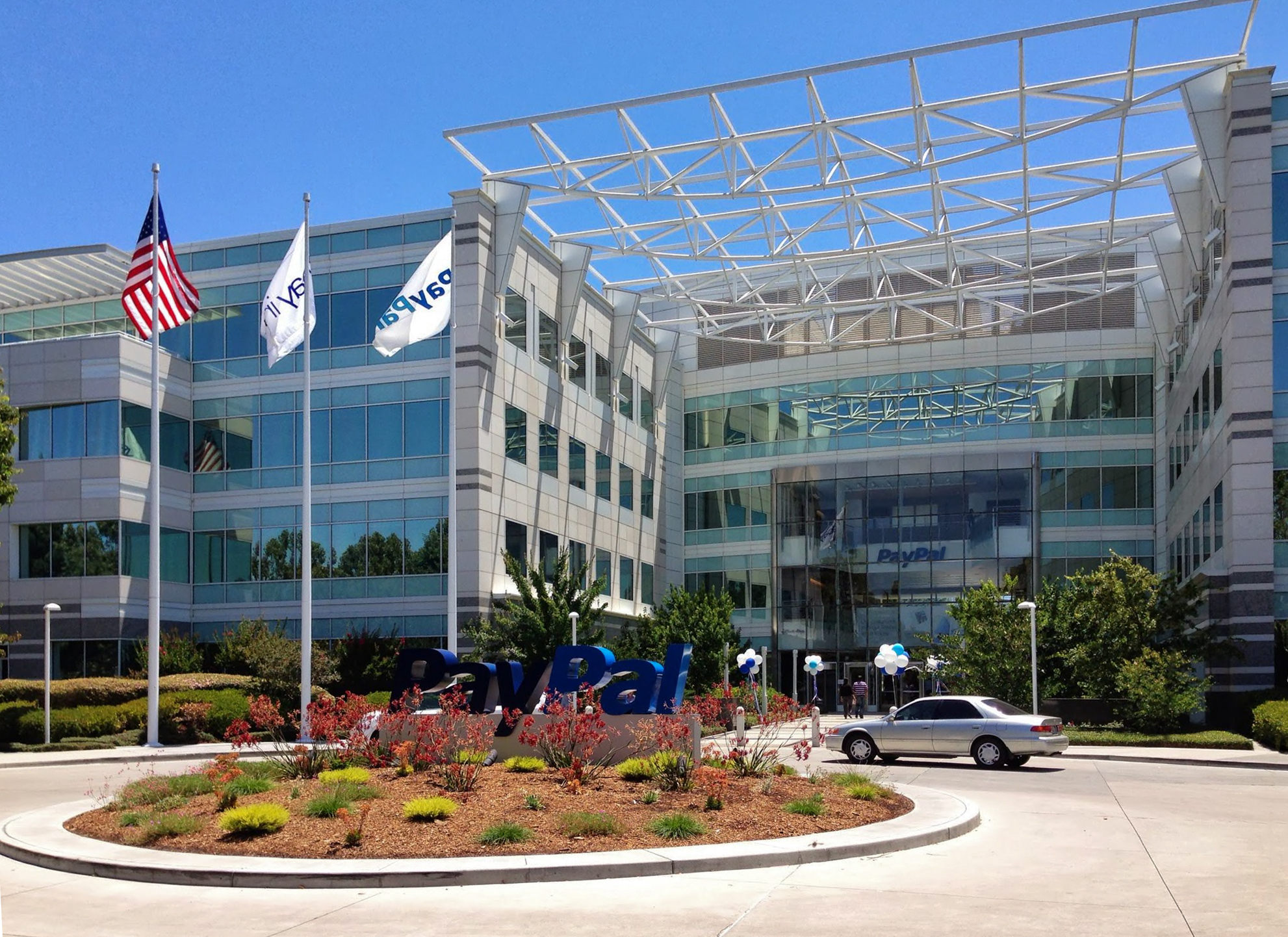
PayPal in San Jose

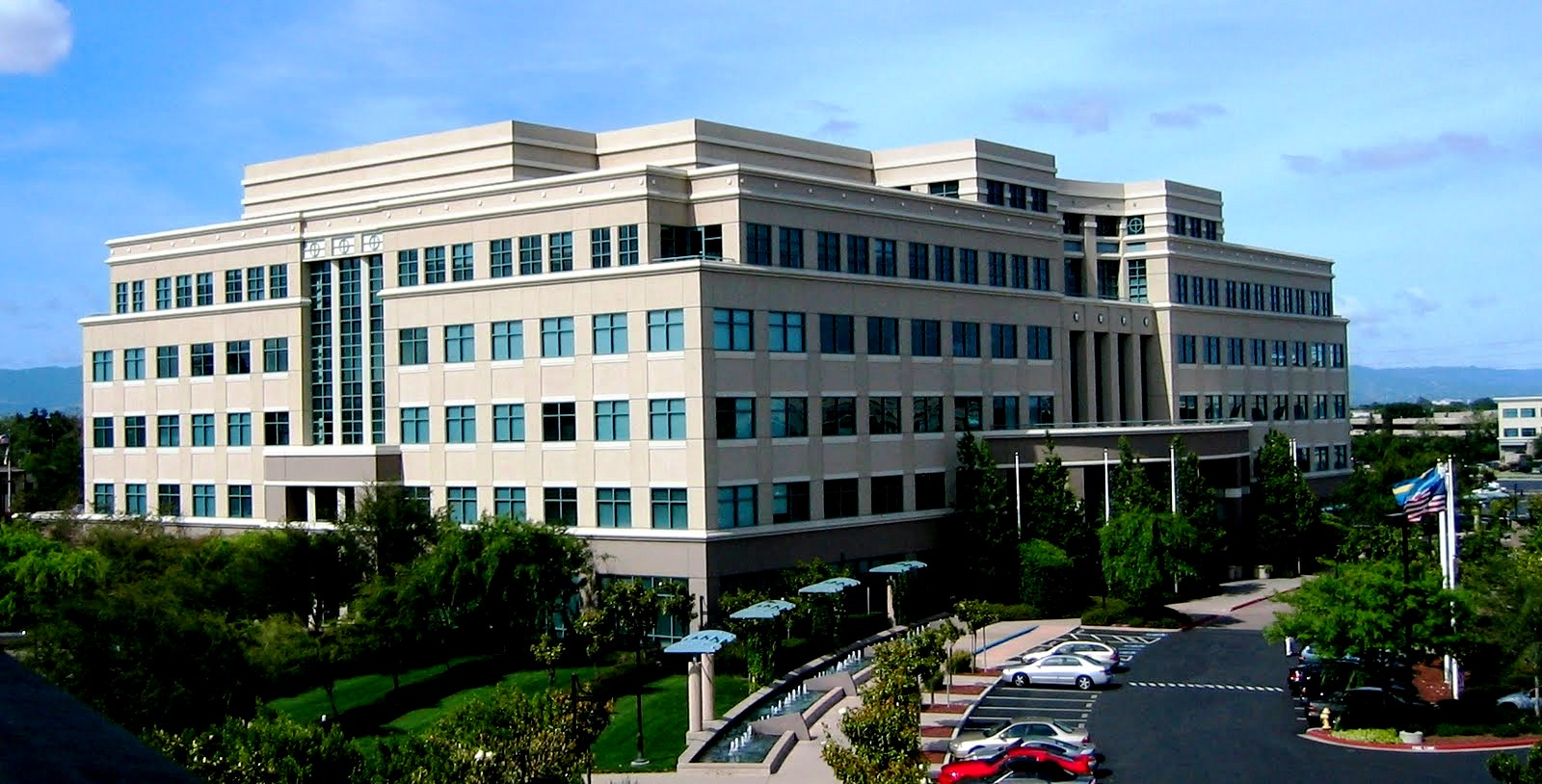
Cisco in the Golden Triangle

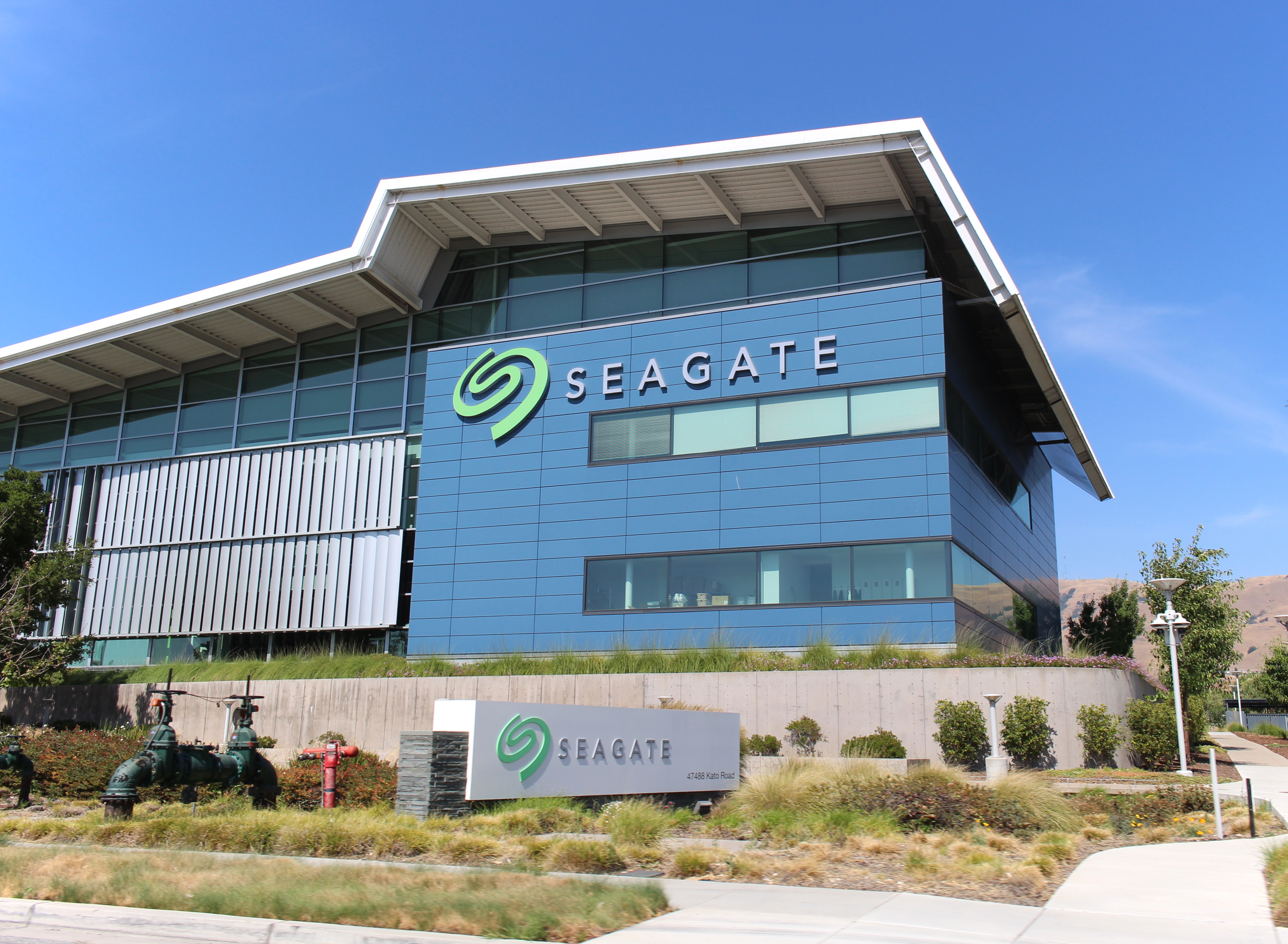
Seagate Technology in Fremont

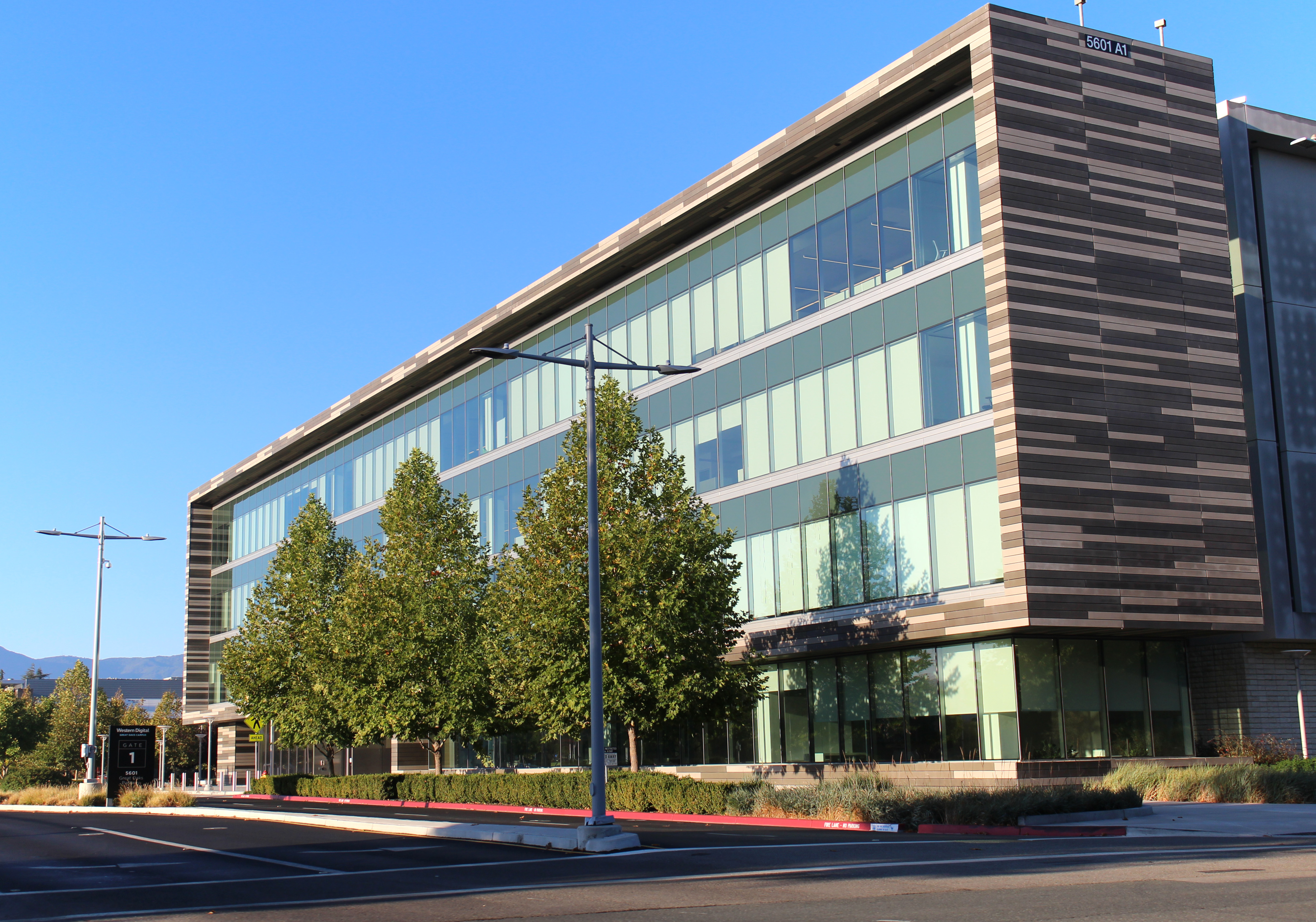
Western Digital in San Jose

Thousands of high technology companies are headquartered in Silicon Valley. Among those, the following are in the Fortune 1000:

- Adobe Inc.
- AMD
- Agilent Technologies
- Alphabet Inc., includes Google
- Apple Inc.
- Applied Materials
- Broadcom Inc.
- Cadence Design Systems
- Cisco Systems
- eBay
- Electronic Arts
- HP Inc.
- Intel
- Intuit
- Intuitive Surgical
- Juniper Networks
- KLA Corporation
- Lam Research
- Meta Platforms, includes Facebook
- NetApp
- Netflix, Inc.
- Nvidia
- PayPal
- Salesforce
- Sanmina Corporation
- Seagate Technology
- ServiceNow
- TD Synnex
- Synopsys
- Western Digital

Additional notable companies headquartered in Silicon Valley (some of which are defunct, subsumed, or relocated) include:

- 23andMe
- 3Com (acquired by Hewlett-Packard)
- 8x8
- Actel (acquired by Microsemi)
- Actuate Corporation
- Adaptec (acquired by PMC-Sierra)
- Aeria Games and Entertainment
- Altera (acquired by Intel)
- Amazon's A9.com
- Amazon's Lab126.com
- Amdahl (acquired by Fujitsu)
- Atari
- Atmel (acquired by Microchip Technology)
- Brocade Communications Systems (acquired by Broadcom)
- Be Inc. (acquired by Palm Inc.)
- BEA Systems (acquired by Oracle Corporation)
- Cypress Semiconductor (acquired by Infineon Technologies)
- Extreme Networks
- Fairchild Semiconductor (acquired by onsemi)
- Flex (formally Flextronics)
- Foundry Networks (acquired by Brocade Communications Systems)
- Geeknet (Slashdot)
- GlobalFoundries (moved to Malta, New York)
- GoPro
- Harmonic, Inc.
- Hitachi Data Systems
- Hitachi Global Storage Technologies (acquired by Western Digital)
- Hewlett Packard Enterprise (moved to Spring, Texas)
- IDEO
- Informatica
- LinkedIn (acquired by Microsoft)
- Lockheed Martin Space (now headquartered in Denver, Colorado)
- LSI (acquired by Broadcom)
- Maxtor (acquired by Seagate)
- McAfee (acquired by Intel)
- Memorex (acquired by Burroughs)
- Mozilla Foundation
- Move, Inc.
- National Semiconductor (acquired by Texas Instruments)
- Nook (subsidiary of Barnes & Noble)
- Oracle Corporation (moved to Austin, Texas)
- Palo Alto Networks
- Palm, Inc. (acquired by TCL Corporation)
- PARC
- Proofpoint
- Quantcast
- Quora
- Rambus
- Roblox Corporation
- Roku, Inc.
- RSA Security (acquired by EMC)
- SanDisk (acquired by Western Digital)
- Signetics
- SolarCity (acquired by Tesla, Inc.)
- Sony Mobile Communications (U.S. subsidiary headquarters)
- Sony Interactive Entertainment
- SRI International
- Sun Microsystems (acquired by Oracle Corporation)
- SunPower
- SurveyMonkey
- Symantec (now part of Gen Digital and headquartered in Tempe, Arizona)
- Syntex (acquired by Roche)
- Tesla, Inc. (now headquartered in Austin, Texas)
- TIBCO Software
- TiVo (acquired by Xperi)
- Uber
- Verifone (moved to Coral Springs, Florida)
- VeriSign (moved to Reston, Virginia)
- Veritas Technologies (split off from Symantec)
- VMware (acquired by Dell Technologies)
- Walmart Labs
- WebEx (acquired by Cisco Systems)
- YouTube (acquired by Google)
- Yelp, Inc.
- Zoom
- Zynga
- Xilinx (acquired by AMD)

== Demographics ==
A 1999 study by AnnaLee Saxenian for the Public Policy Institute of California reported that a third of Silicon Valley scientists and engineers were immigrants and that nearly a quarter of Silicon Valley's high-technology firms since 1980 were run by Chinese (17 percent) or Indian descent CEOs (7 percent). In addition, Saxenian's study found that successful immigrant entrepreneurs relied heavily on ethnic resources as they integrated into the Silicon Valley work culture and American society. There is a stratum of well-compensated technical employees and managers, including tens of thousands of "single-digit millionaires". This income and range of assets will support a middle-class lifestyle in Silicon Valley.

=== Gender ===
In November 2006, the University of California, Davis released a report analyzing business leadership by women within the state. The report showed that although 103 of the 400 largest public companies headquartered in California were located in Santa Clara County (the most of all counties), only 8.8% of Silicon Valley companies had women CEOs. This was the lowest percentage in the state. (San Francisco County had 19.2% and Marin County had 18.5%.)

Silicon Valley tech leadership positions are occupied almost exclusively by men. This is also represented in the number of new companies founded by women as well as the number of women-lead startups that receive venture capital funding. Wadhwa said he believes that a contributing factor is a lack of parental encouragement to study science and engineering. He also cited a lack of women role models and noted that most famous tech leaders—like Bill Gates, Steve Jobs, and Mark Zuckerberg—are men.

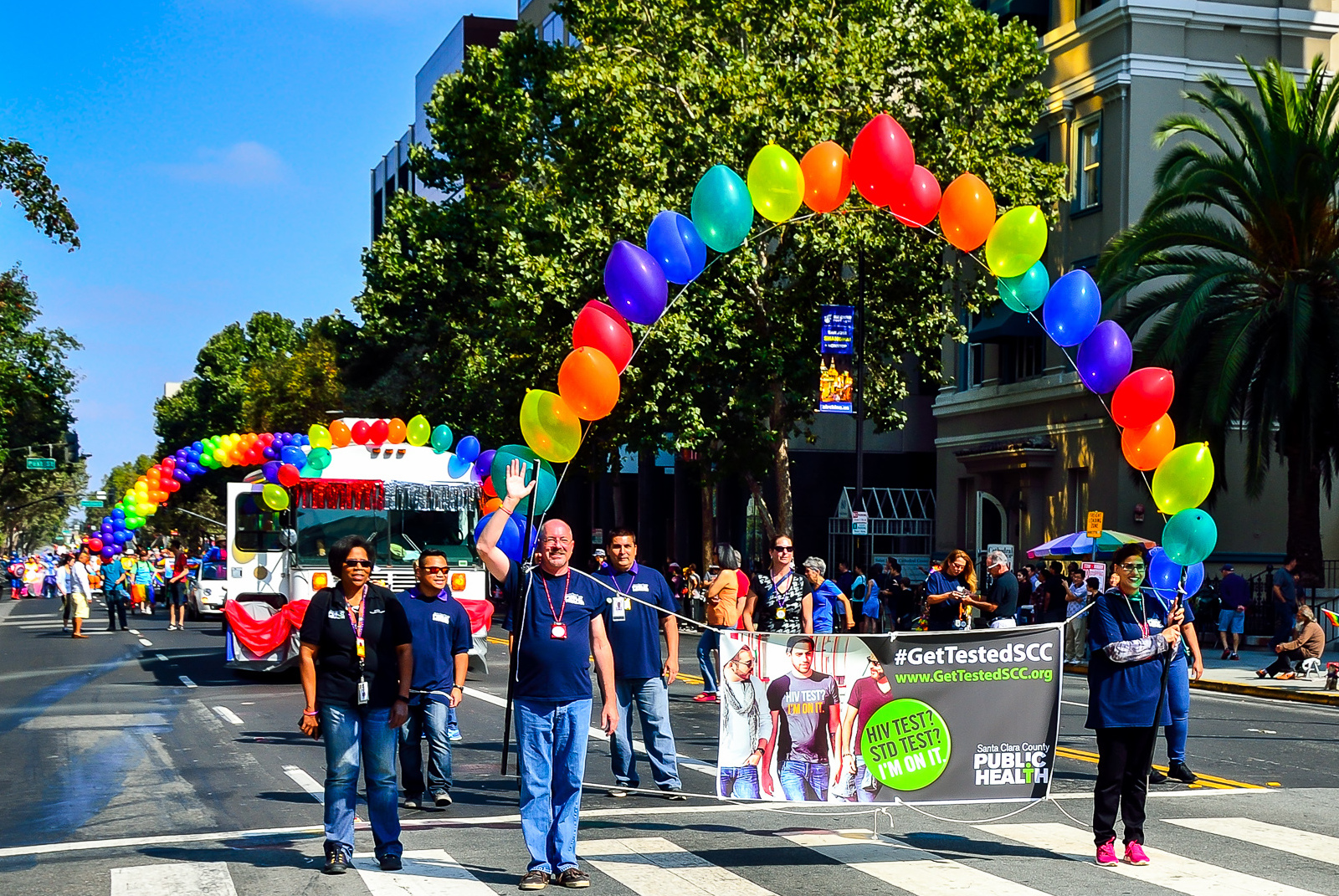
Silicon Valley Pride in San Jose

As of October 2014, some high-profile Silicon Valley firms were working actively to prepare and recruit women. Bloomberg reported that Apple, Facebook, Google, and Microsoft attended the 20th annual Grace Hopper Celebration of Women in Computing conference to actively recruit and potentially hire female engineers and technology experts. The same month, the second annual Platform Summit was held to discuss increasing racial and gender diversity in tech. As of April 2015 experienced women were engaged in creation of venture capital firms which leveraged women's perspectives in funding of startups.

After UC Davis published its Study of California Women Business Leaders in November 2006, some San Jose Mercury News readers dismissed the possibility that sexism contributed in making Silicon Valley's leadership gender gap the highest in the state. A January 2015 issue of Newsweek magazine featured an article detailing reports of sexism and misogyny in Silicon Valley. The article's author, Nina Burleigh, asked, "Where were all these offended people when women like Heidi Roizen published accounts of having a venture capitalist stick her hand in his pants under a table while a deal was being discussed?" As of 2014, the board of directors of the top 15 companies in Santa Clara, San Mateo, San Francisco, Alameda, and Contra Costa Counties were composed of 15.7% women, and the top 150 were composed of just 10% women, compared with 20.9% in the S&P 100.

The 2012 lawsuit Pao v. Kleiner Perkins was filed in San Francisco County Superior Court by executive Ellen Pao for gender discrimination against her employer, Kleiner Perkins. The case went to trial in February 2015. On March 27, 2015, the jury found in favor of Kleiner Perkins on all counts. Nevertheless, the case, which had wide press coverage, resulted in major advances in consciousness of gender discrimination on the part of venture capital and technology firms and their women employees. Two other cases have been filed against Facebook and Twitter.

=== Race ===
A 2017 study showed that white males made up the majority of higher positions in Silicon Valley tech firms, with 58.7% of executive positions and 46.5% of managers. The second highest position holders were Asian men, with 16.3% of executive positions and 17.9% of managers. African/Black and Hispanic/Latino people had the lowest percentages in all categories.

Harvard Business Review published an article in 2018 discussing diversity and inclusion and gave statistics on black employees along with advice to future black technicians. LeRon L. Barton, a black man who spent over two decades in Tech, gave an insight on his work experiences. He said he saw no one who looked like him in his profession and said he received many comments that he believed disregarded his skill such as being called the diversity hire. He described being isolated from his team, and constantly having to prove he could do the job he was hired for.

Some of the most successful Black Silicon Valley tech figures include Roy Clay, the founder of Hewlett Packard's computing division who is considered the "Godfather of Silicon Valley"; Ken Coleman, the first Black recruiter at Hewlett and later an executive at Activision and Silicon Graphics; John W. Thompson, the first Black CEO of a major tech company, the enterprise security software provider Symantec, and the chairman of computing giant Microsoft replacing the founder Bill Gates; Robert F. Smith, former Goldman Sachs technology M&A banker and founder of software private equity firm Vista Equity Partners; Charles Phillips, President of Oracle and CEO of Infor who coined the term "enterprise software" during his time as a technology banker at Morgan Stanley with Frank Quattrone and Mary Meeker; and Stacy Brown-Philpot, the first Black female tech CEO at online marketplace TaskRabbit.

Late 2024 and early 2025 marked a shift in the discourse around DEI or diversity equity and inclusion initiatives in tech companies. As many tech companies faced economic headwinds and pressure to reduce costs in the midst of falling valuations and rising interest rates, leading to widespread layoffs and budget scrutiny by investors, DEI programs were often the first thing out the door.

=== Statistics ===
In 2014, tech companies Google, Yahoo!, Facebook, Apple, and others, released corporate transparency reports that offered detailed employee breakdowns. In May, Google said 17% of its tech employees worldwide were women, and, in the U.S., 1% of its tech workers were black and 2% were Hispanic/Latino. June 2014 brought reports from Yahoo! and Facebook. Yahoo! said that 15% of its tech jobs were held by women, 2% of its tech employees were black and 4% Hispanic. Facebook reported that 15% of its tech workforce was female, and 3% was Hispanic and 1% was black.

In August 2014, Apple reported that 80% of its global tech staff was male and that, in the U.S., 54% of its tech jobs were staffed by Caucasians and 23% by Asians. Soon after, USA Today published an article about Silicon Valley's lack of tech-industry diversity, pointing out that it is largely white or Asian, and male. "Blacks and Hispanics are largely absent," it reported, "and women are underrepresented in Silicon Valley—from giant companies to start-ups to venture capital firms." Civil rights activist Jesse Jackson said of improving diversity in the tech industry, "This is the next step in the civil rights movement" while T. J. Rodgers has argued against Jackson's assertions.

== Municipalities ==
Silicon Valley centers on the following municipalities:

- Menlo Park
- Mountain View
- Palo Alto
- Sunnyvale

According to the Silicon Valley Chamber of Commerce, the following Santa Clara County and San Mateo County municipalities may also be considered to be in Silicon Valley:

- Belmont
- Campbell
- Cupertino
- Gilroy
- Los Altos
- Los Gatos
- Milpitas
- Morgan Hill
- Redwood City
- San Carlos
- San Jose
- Santa Clara
- Saratoga

The geographical boundaries of Silicon Valley have changed over the years. Historically, the term Silicon Valley was treated as synonymous with Santa Clara Valley and adjacent regions in southern San Mateo County and southern Alameda County. However, the metonym "Silicon Valley" has also been used to refer to technology companies based in other Northern California locales, such as San Francisco, Contra Costa County, Santa Cruz County, and the northern parts of Alameda County and San Mateo County.

== Education ==
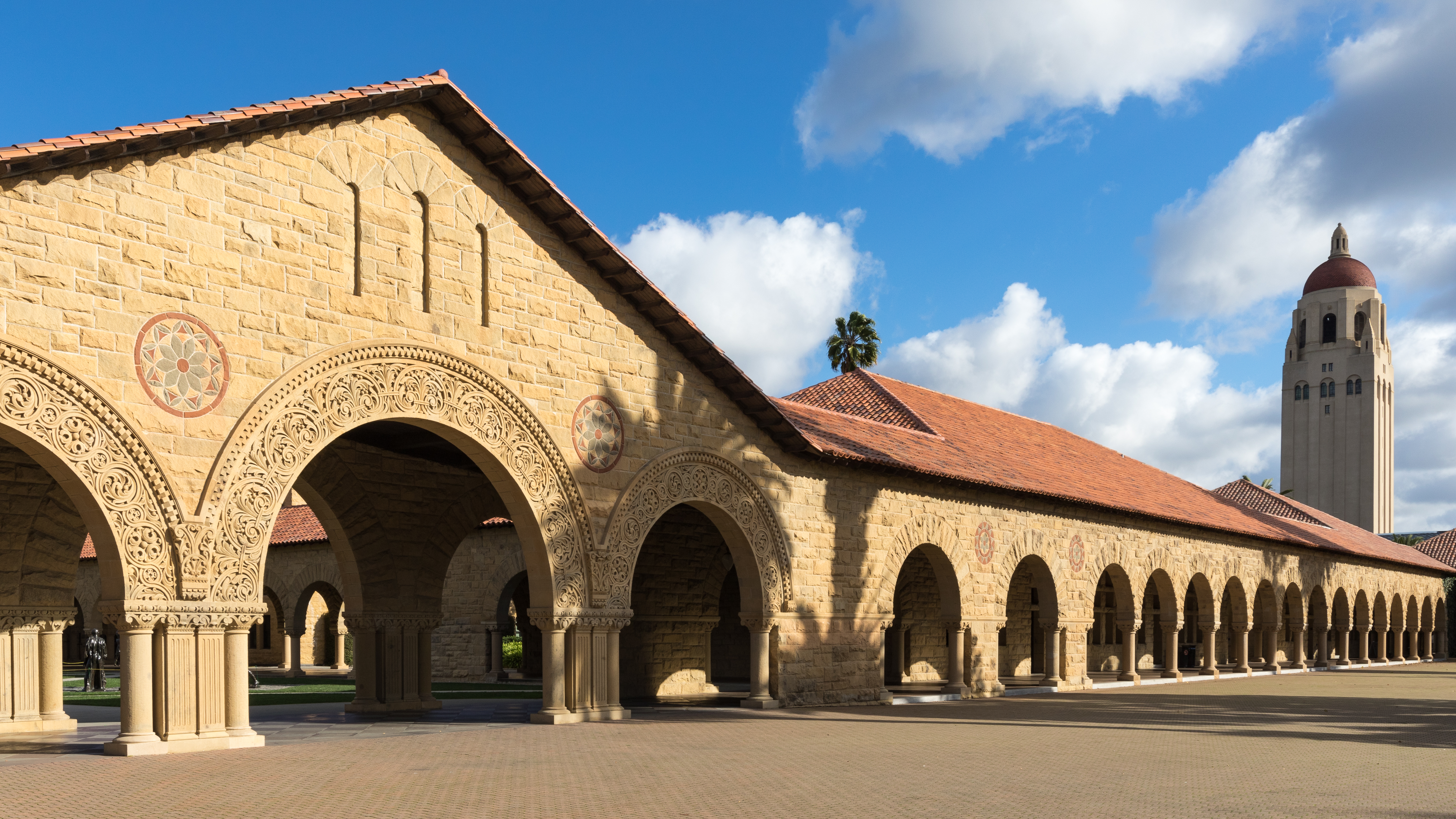
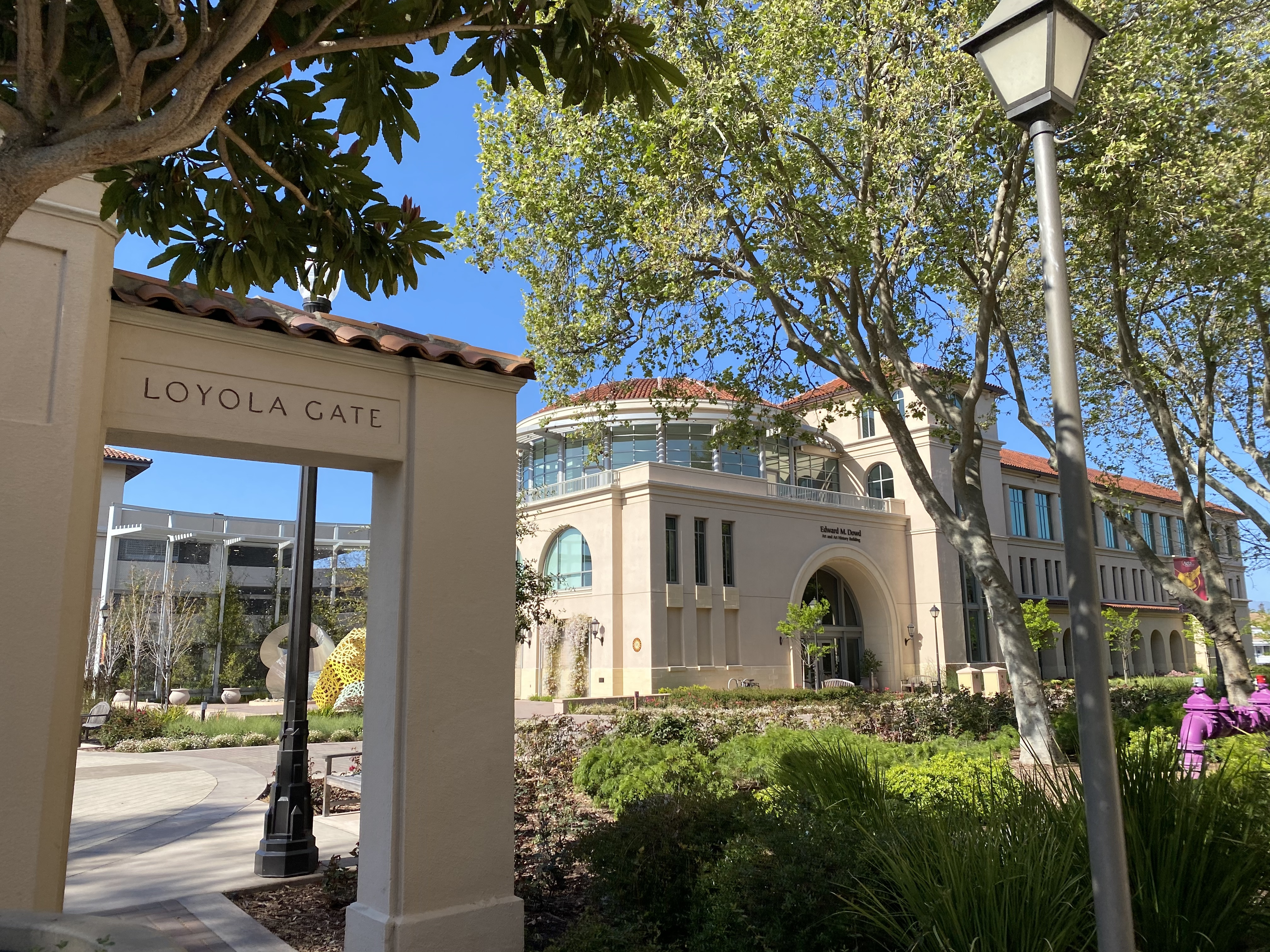
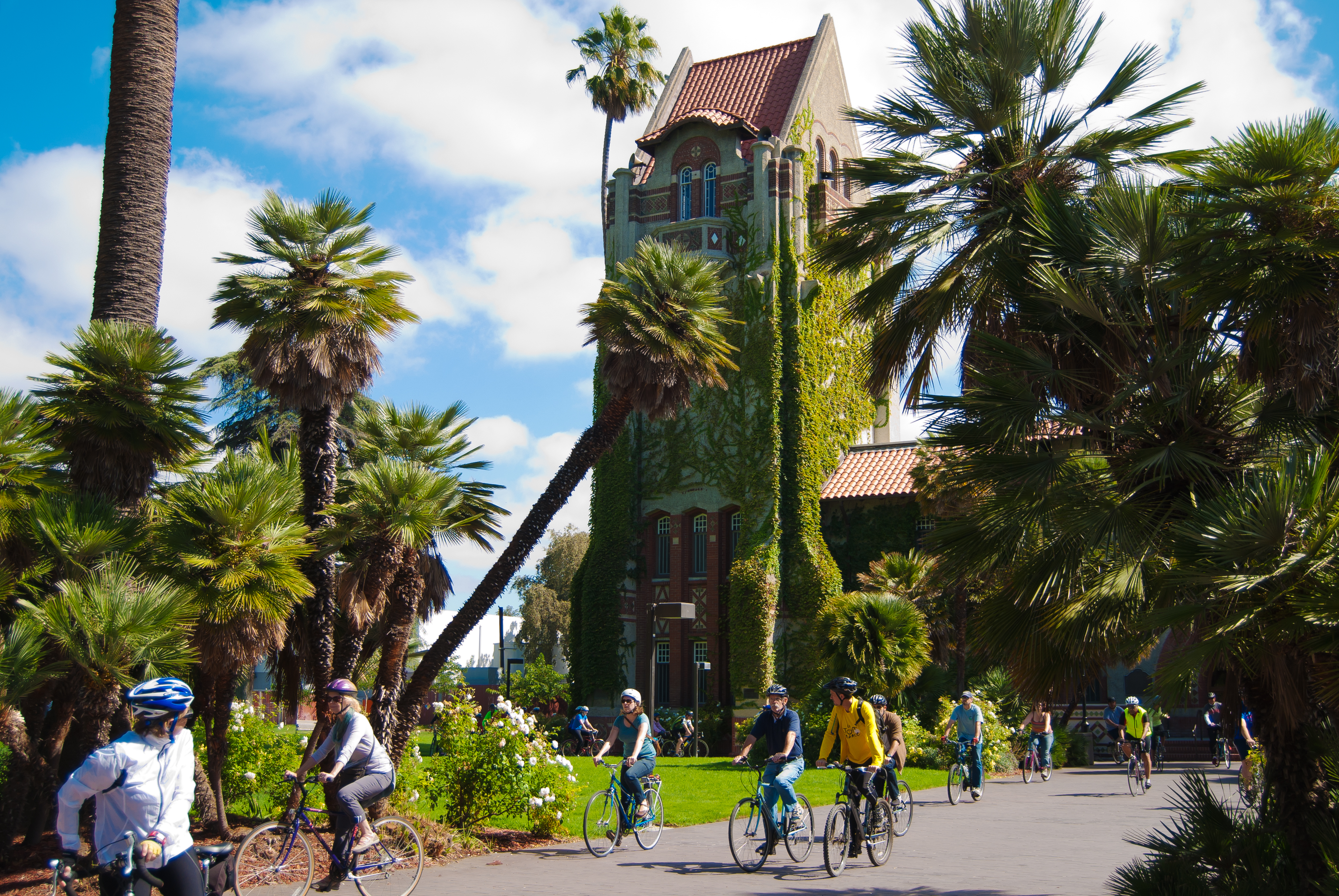
Stanford University (top), Santa Clara University (middle), and San Jose State University (bottom)

=== Colleges and universities ===
Silicon Valley is associated with many colleges and universities in and near the Valley. The most prominent of those institutions are Stanford University, a private university located in the Valley, and the University of California, Berkeley, a public university located north of Silicon Valley. Both are considered to be world-leading institutions. Colleges and universities in the area include:

- Bay Area Medical Academy
- California University of Management and Technology
- California South Bay University
- Carnegie Mellon Silicon Valley
- Cañada College
- Chabot College
- De Anza College
- DeVry University
- Evergreen Valley College
- Foothill College
- Gavilan College
- Golden Gate University
- International Technological University
- Lincoln Law School of San Jose
- Menlo College
- Mission College
- National University San Jose Campus
- Ohlone College
- Palo Alto University
- Palmer College of Chiropractic, West Campus
- Peralta Community College District
- San Francisco Bay University
- San Jose City College
- San José State University
- Santa Clara University
- Sofia University
- Stanford University
- University of California, Berkeley
- University of California, Santa Cruz, Silicon Valley Campus
- University of San Francisco South Bay Campus
- University of Silicon Valley
- West Valley College
- William Jessup University

=== Secondary education ===
Funding for public schools in upscale Silicon Valley communities such as Woodside is often supplemented by grants from private foundations set up for that purpose and funded by local residents. Schools in less affluent areas such as East Palo Alto must depend on state funding.

== Culture ==
=== Events ===
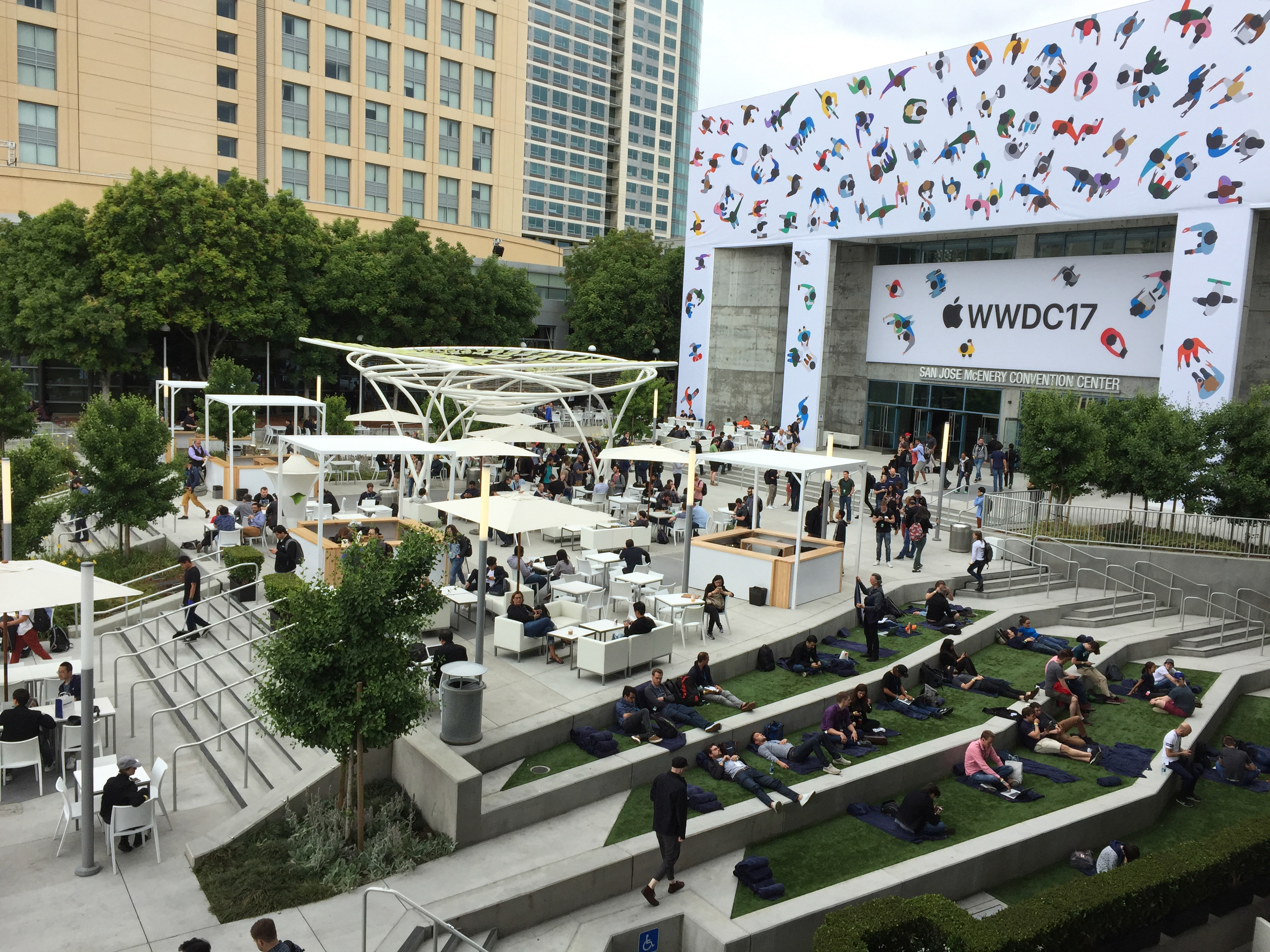
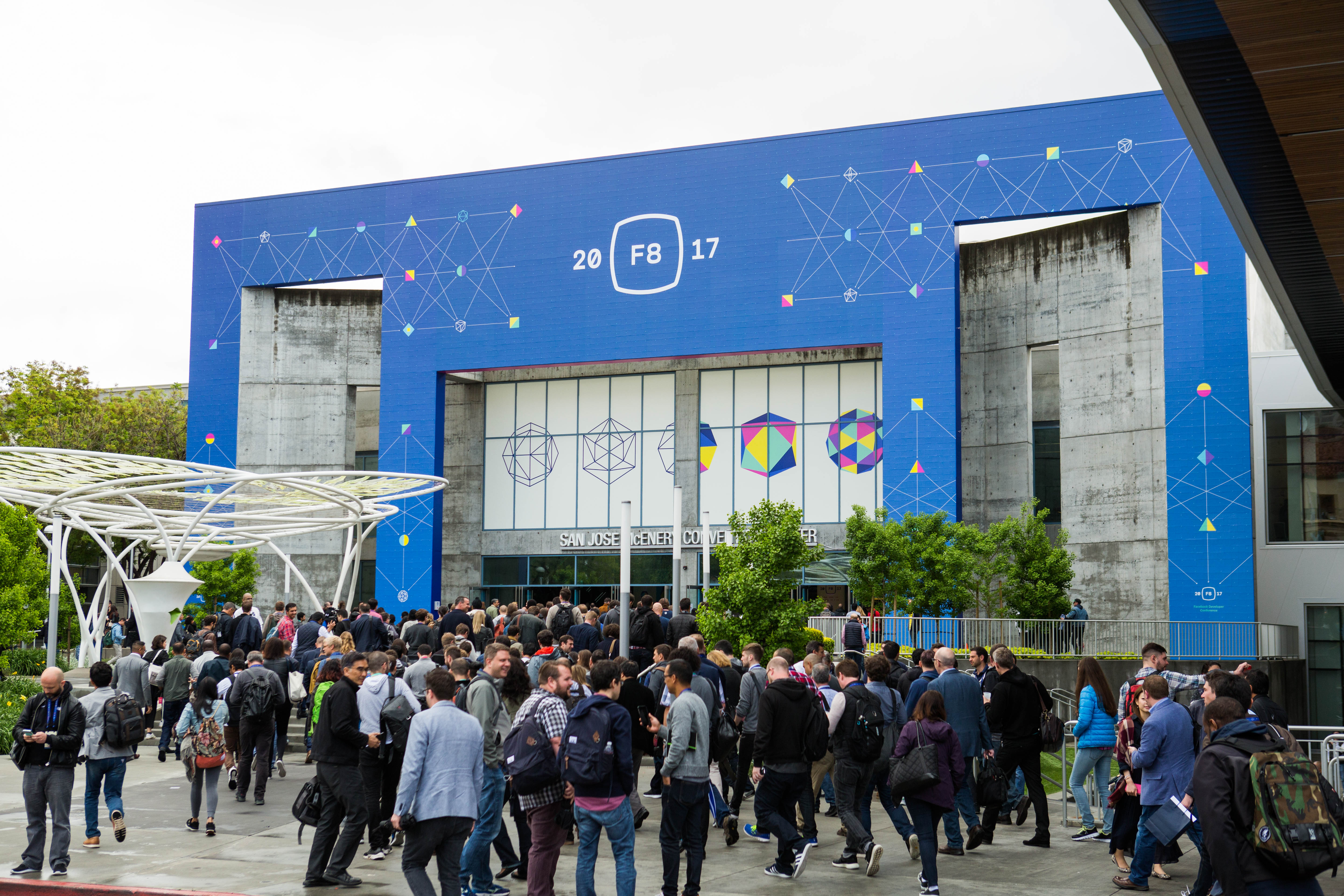
The 2017 Apple Worldwide Developers Conference & Facebook F8 2017, at the San Jose Convention Center
- Facebook F8, San Jose
- SiliCon, San Jose
- Silicon Valley Pride, San Jose
- Worldwide Developers Conference, Cupertino

=== Museums ===
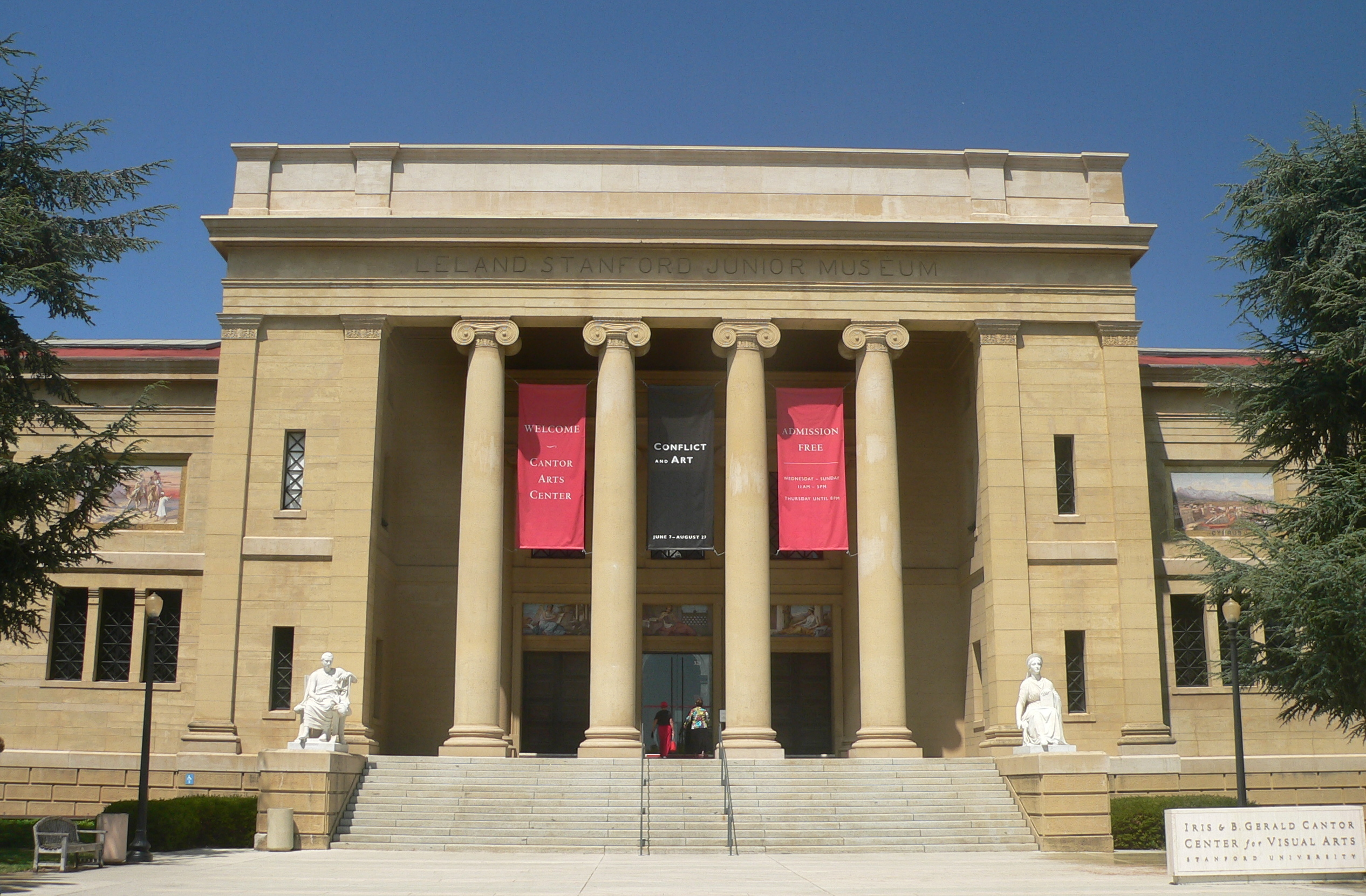
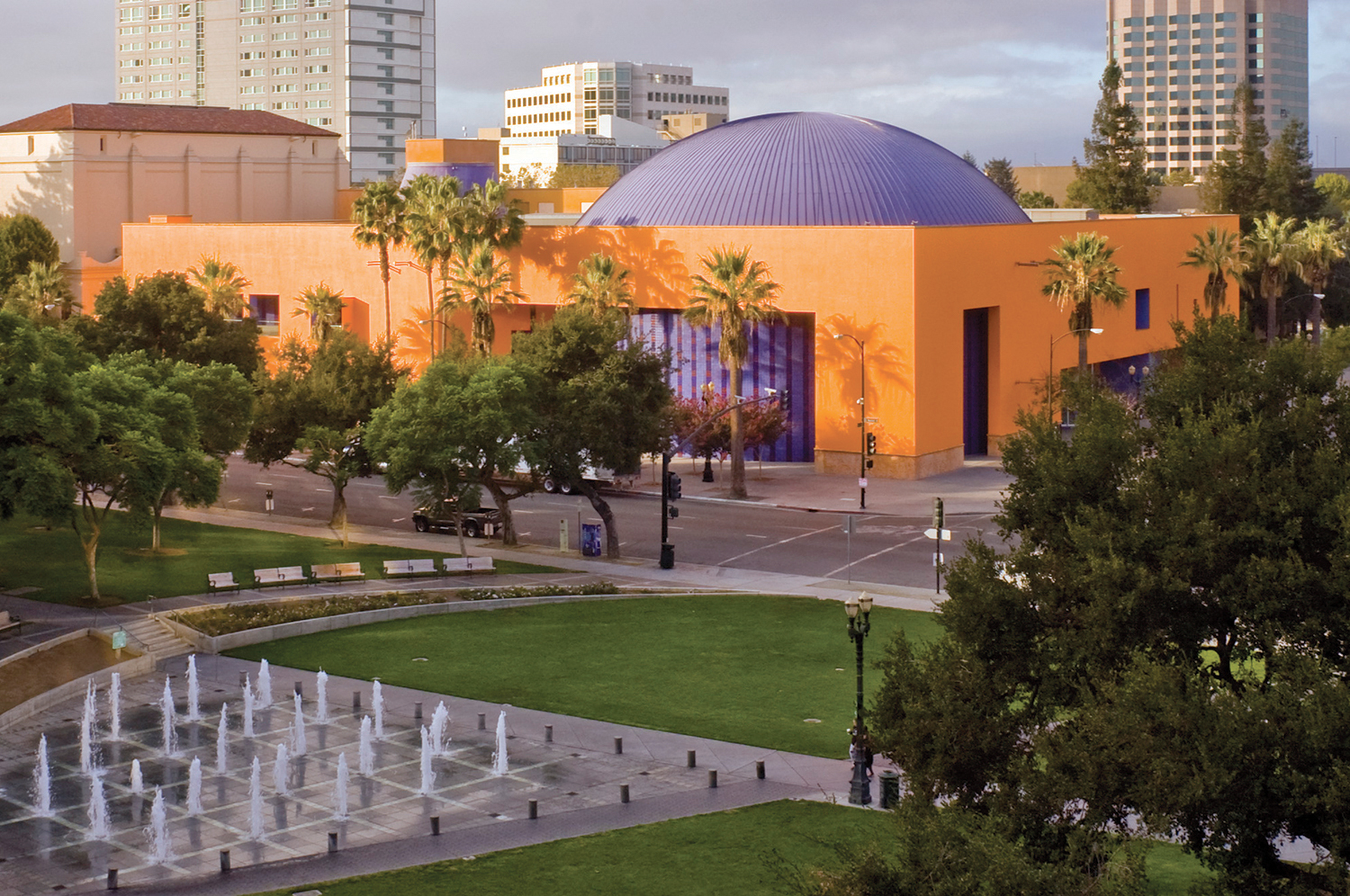
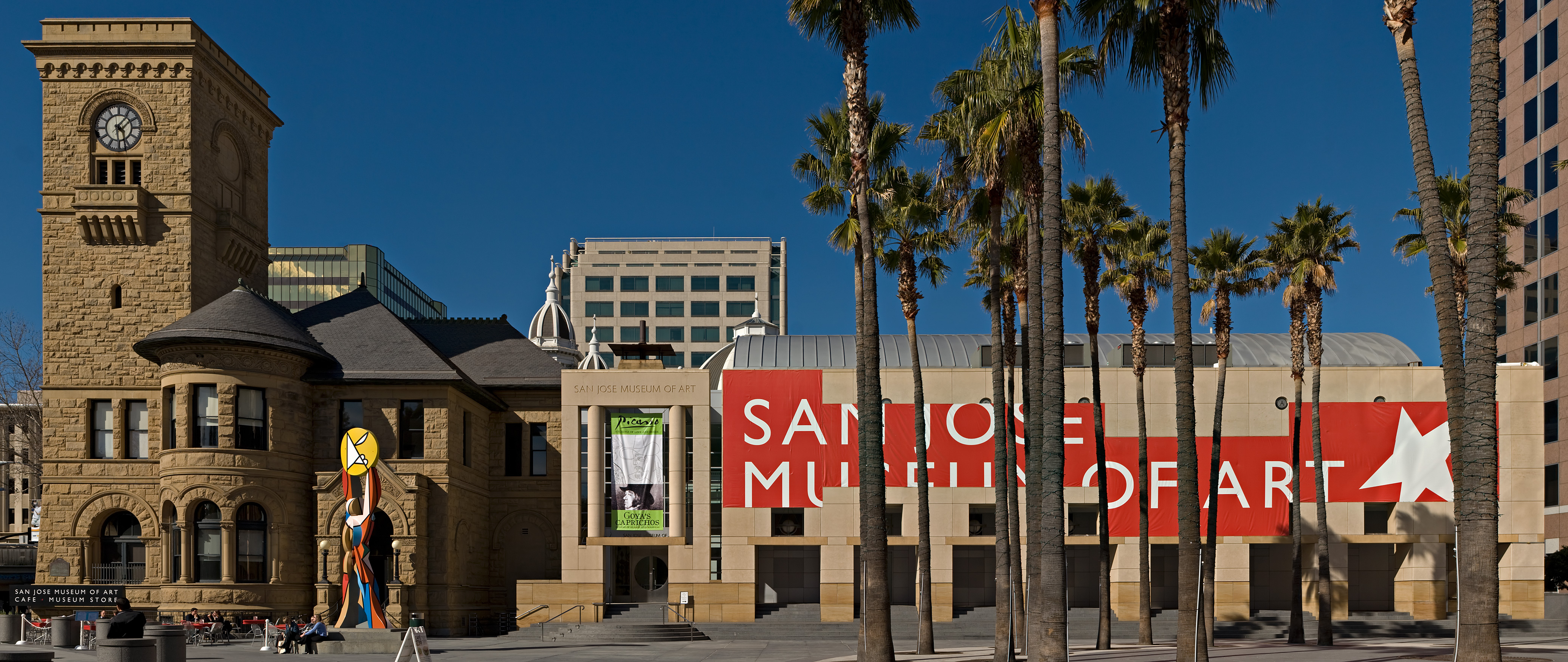
From top: Cantor Arts Center, The Tech Interactive and the San José Museum of Art
- Computer History Museum
- Children's Discovery Museum of San Jose
- De Saisset Museum at Santa Clara University
- Hiller Aviation Museum
- History Park by History San José
- HP Garage
- Intel Museum
- Los Altos History Museum
- Moffett Field Historical Society Museum
- Palo Alto Art Center
- Sunnyvale Heritage Park Museum
- The Tech Interactive

== Media ==
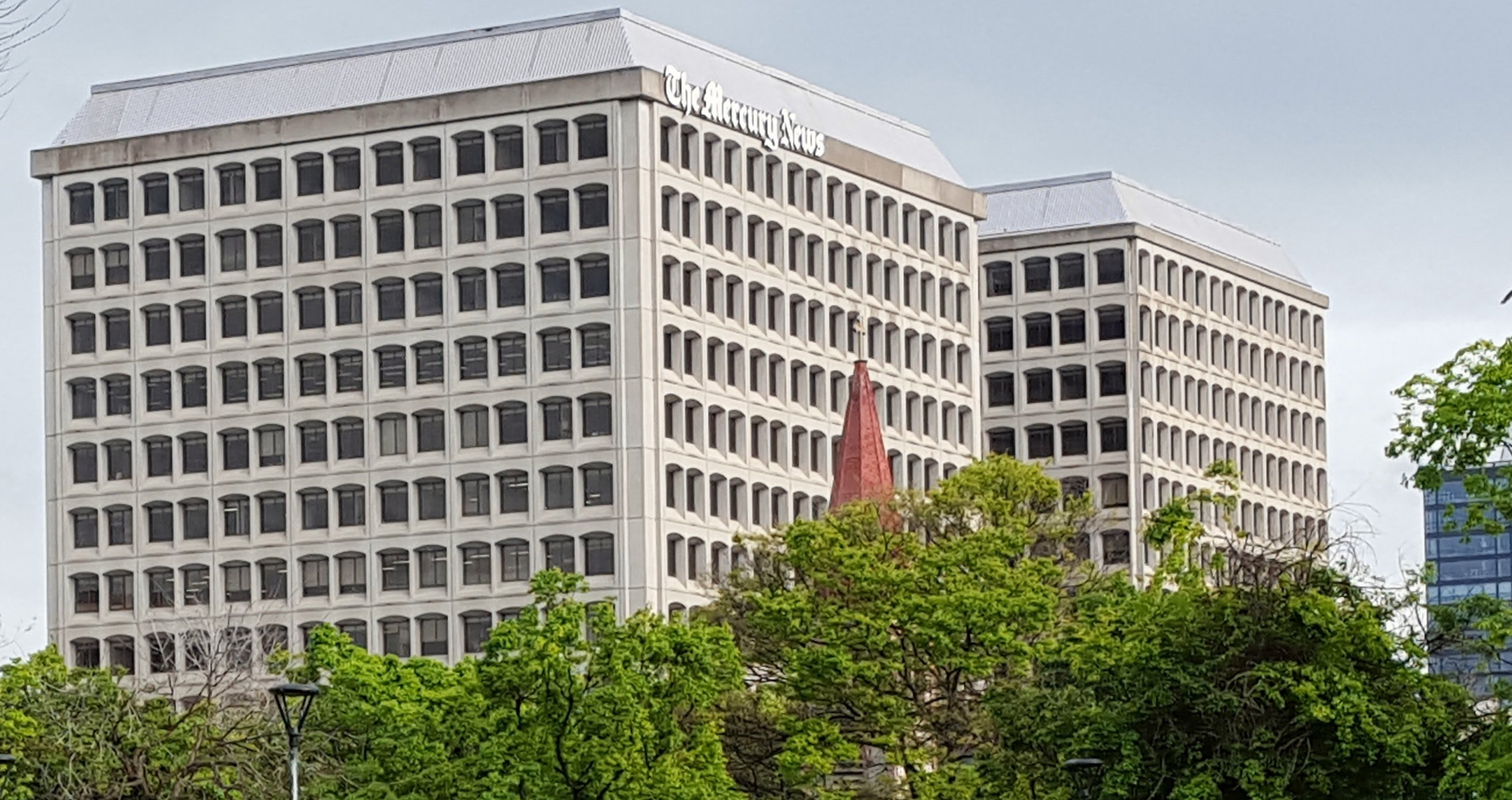
Headquarters of The Mercury News, Silicon Valley's largest newspaper, in Downtown San Jose

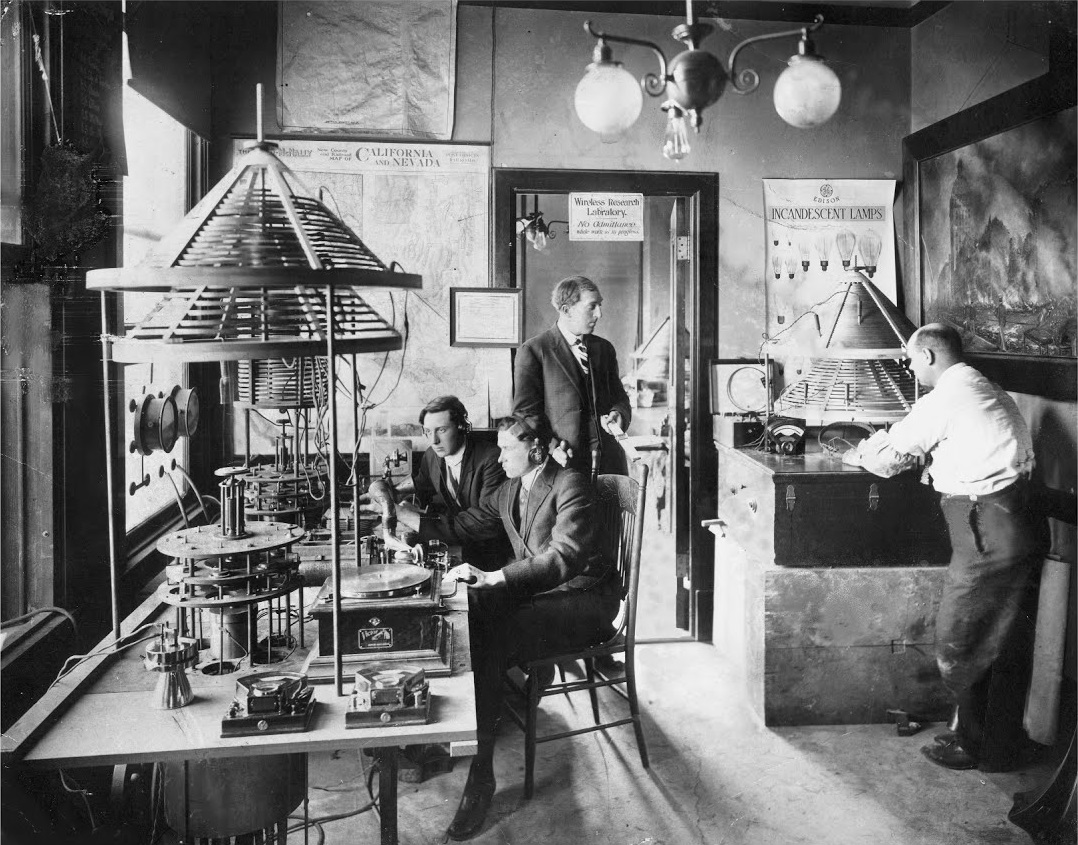
50 W. San Fernando Street in downtown San Jose is the site of the world's first radio broadcasting station, created in 1909 by Charles Herrold, the "Father of Broadcasting".

In 1980, Intelligent Machines Journal changed its name to InfoWorld, and, with offices in Palo Alto, began covering the emergence of the microcomputer industry in the valley.

Local and national media cover Silicon Valley and its companies. CNN, The Wall Street Journal, and Bloomberg News operate Silicon Valley bureaus out of Palo Alto. Public broadcaster KQED (TV) and KQED-FM, as well as the Bay Area's local ABC station KGO-TV, operate bureaus in San Jose. KNTV, NBC's local Bay Area affiliate "NBC Bay Area", is located in San Jose. Produced from this location is the nationally distributed TV Show "Tech Now" as well as the CNBC Silicon Valley bureau. San Jose-based media serving Silicon Valley include the San Jose Mercury News daily and the Metro Silicon Valley weekly.

Specialty media include El Observador and the San Jose / Silicon Valley Business Journal. Most of the Bay Area's other major TV stations, newspapers, and media operate in San Francisco or Oakland. Patch.com operates various web portals, providing local news, discussion and events for residents of Silicon Valley. Mountain View has a public nonprofit station, KMVT-15. KMVT-15's shows include Silicon Valley Education News (EdNews)-Edward Tico Producer.

== Cultural references ==
Some appearances in media, in order by release date:

- A View to a Kill—1985 film from the James Bond series. Bond thwarts an elaborate ploy by the film's antagonist, Max Zorin, to destroy Silicon Valley.
- Triumph of the Nerds: The Rise of Accidental Empires – 1996 documentary
- Pirates of Silicon Valley—1999 film about the early days of Apple Computer and Microsoft (though the latter has never been based in Silicon Valley)
- Code Monkeys—2007 comedy series
- The Social Network—2010 film
- Startups Silicon Valley—reality TV series, debuted 2012 on Bravo
- Betas—TV series, debuted 2013 on Amazon Video
- Jobs—2013 film
- The Internship—2013 comedy film about working at Google
- Silicon Valley—2014 American sitcom from HBO
- Halt and Catch Fire—2014 TV series, the last two seasons are primarily set in Silicon Valley
- Steve Jobs—2015 film
- Watch Dogs 2—2016 video game developed by Ubisoft
- Valley of the Boom—2019 docudrama about the 1990s tech boom in Silicon Valley
- Devs—2020 TV miniseries
- Start-Up—2020 South Korean television series, when three artificial intelligence (A.I.) developers from South Korea are offered positions as engineers for the fictional company, 2STO which is located in Silicon Valley.
- The Dropout—2022 TV miniseries about the rise and fall of Theranos
- Super Pumped—2022 TV series about Travis Kalanick's time at Uber

== See also ==
- Fail fast (business), an element of corporate culture common among Silicon Valley organizations
- How to Rule the World: An Education in Power at Stanford University, a book by Theo Baker
- List of tourist attractions in Silicon Valley
- List of places with "Silicon" names around the world
- List of technology centers around the world
- Semiconductor industry
