= Masatoshi Shima =

Japanese electronics engineer

Professor Masatoshi Shima Dr.Eng.
- 嶋正利
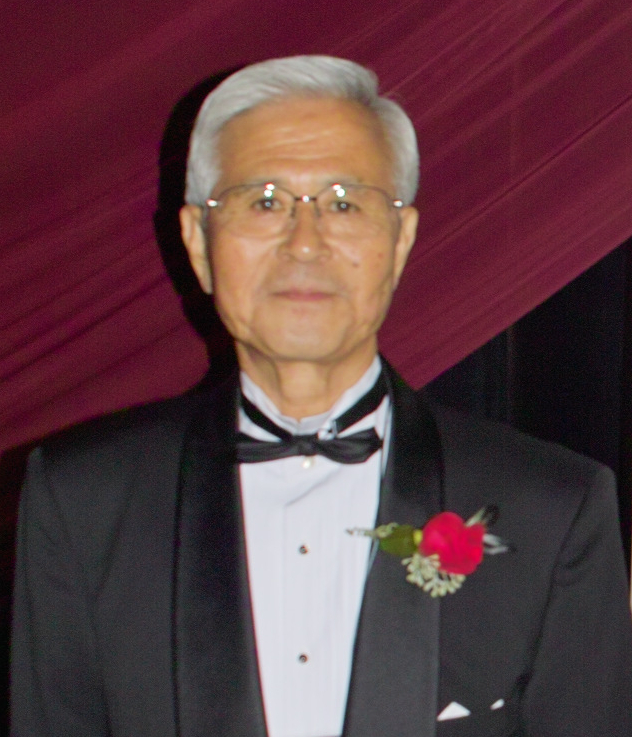
- at the Computer History Museum 2009 Fellow Awards event
- Born: August 22, 1943 (age 82); Shizuoka, Shizuoka Prefecture, Japan
- Citizenship: Japan
- Education: B.S., Tohoku University (1967); Dr.Eng., Tsukuba University (1991)
- Known for: Microprocessors: Intel 4004, 8080, Zilog Z80, Z8000; Peripheral chips: Intel 8259, 8255, 8253, 8257, 8251
- Awards: Kyoto Prize (1997); Computer History Museum Fellow (2009)
- Scientific career
- Fields: Electronic engineering Microprocessor
- Institutions: Busicom (1967-1972); Intel (1972-1975, 1981-1986); Zilog (1975-1980) VM Technology (1986-1991) University of Aizu (2000)

Masatoshi Shima (嶋 正利, Shima Masatoshi; born August 22, 1943) is a Japanese electronics engineer. He was one of the architects of the world's first microprocessor, the Intel 4004. In 1968, Shima worked for Busicom in Japan, and did the logic design for a specialized CPU to be translated into three-chip custom chips. In 1969, he worked with Intel's Ted Hoff and Stanley Mazor to reduce the three-chip Busicom proposal into a one-chip architecture. In 1970, that architecture was transformed into a silicon chip, the Intel 4004, by Federico Faggin, with Shima's assistance in logic design.

He later joined Intel in 1972. There, he worked with Faggin to develop the Intel 8080, released in 1974. Shima then developed several Intel peripheral chips, some used in the IBM PC, such as the 8259 interrupt controller, 8255 programmable peripheral interface chip, 8253 timer chip, 8257 direct memory access (DMA) chip and 8251 serial communication USART chip. He then joined Zilog, where he worked with Faggin to develop the Zilog Z80 (1976) and Z8000 (1979).

== Early life and career ==
He studied organic chemistry at Tohoku University in Sendai, Miyagi Prefecture, Japan. With poor prospects for employment in the field of chemistry, he went to work for Busicom, a business calculator manufacturer, joining in Spring 1967. There, he learned about software and digital logic design, from 1967 to 1968.

== Intel 4004 ==
After Busicom decided to use large-scale integration (LSI) circuits in their calculator products, they began work on what later became known as the "Busicom Project", a chipset for the Busicom 141-PF calculator that led to creating the first microprocessor, the Intel 4004. In April 1968, Shima was asked to design the logic for what was intended to become a future chipset to be designed and produced by a semiconductor company. Shima designed a special-purpose LSI chipset, along with his supervisor Tadashi Tanba, in 1968. His design consisted of seven LSI chips, including a three-chip CPU. Shima's initial design included arithmetic units (adders), multiplier units, registers, read-only memory, and a macro-instruction set to control a decimal computer system. Busicom wanted to produce a general-purpose LSI chipset, for not only desktop calculators, but also other equipment such as a teller machine, cash register and billing machine. Shima began work on a general-purpose LSI chipset in late 1968, and Busicom then approached the American companies Mostek and Intel for converting the logic into MOS circuits and the chip's layout for manufacturing. The job was given to Intel, who back then was more of a memory company and had facilities to manufacture the high density silicon gate metal–oxide–semiconductor (MOS) chip Busicom required.

Shima went to Intel in June 1969 to present the proposal. Due to Intel lacking logic engineers to understand the logic schematics or circuit engineers to convert them, Intel asked Shima to simplify the logic. This was then formulated by Intel's Marcian "Ted" Hoff in 1969, simplifying Shima's initial design down to four chips, including a one-chip CPU. Due to Hoff's formulation lacking key details, Shima came up with his own ideas to find solutions for its implementation. They both eventually realized the 4-bit microprocessor concept, with the help of Intel's Stanley Mazor to interpret the ideas of Shima and Hoff. Shima was responsible for adding a 10-bit static shift register to make it useful as a printer's buffer and keyboard interface, many improvements in the instruction set, making the random-access memory (RAM) organization suitable for a calculator, the memory address information transfer, the key program in an area of performance and program capacity, the functional specification, decimal computer idea, software, desktop calculator logic, real-time input/output (I/O) control, and data exchange instruction between the accumulator and general-purpose register. The specifications of the four chips were developed over a period of a few months in 1969, between an Intel team led by Hoff and a Busicom team led by Shima.

After Shima went back to Japan in late 1969 and then returned to Intel in early 1970, he found that no further work had been done on the 4004 since he left, and that Hoff was no longer working on the project. The project leader had become Federico Faggin, who had only joined Intel a week before Shima arrived. Faggin was hired from Fairchild Semiconductor, where he had developed the original MOS silicon gate technology, the only technology that could be used to design a chip of the complexity and speed of the 4004. Shima worked with him, assisting him with the logic design the 4004 processor He worked at the Intel offices for six months, from April until October 1970. His company then sold the rights to use the 4004 to Intel, with an exception for use in business calculators.

Shima led the first commercial implementation of the 4004 chipset, developing the Busicom 141-PF calculator, and Busicom went on to make calculators, billing machines, teller machines and cash registers, mostly on an OEM basis with NCR, which would sell 100,000 units.

== Intel 8080 to Zilog Z8000 ==
After the 4004, Intel designed the 8008 (architecture by Computer Terminal Corporation, design by Federico Faggin and Hal Feeney). Shima then joined Intel in 1972. He was employed to implement the transistor-level logic of Intel's next microprocessor, which became the Intel 8080 (conception and architecture by Federico Faggin), released in 1974. Shima then developed several Intel peripheral chips, some used in the IBM PC, such as the 8259 interrupt controller, 8255 parallel port chip, 8253 timer chip, 8257 DMA chip and 8251 serial communication USART chip. He was not involved in the creation of the Intel 8088 or 8086.

Shima moved to Zilog in 1975 and, using only a few assistants, developed the transistor-level and physical implementation of the Zilog Z80, under the supervision of Faggin, who conceived and designed the Z80 architecture to be an instruction set compatible with the Intel 8080. This was followed by the same task for the 16-bit Z8000.

According to coworkers from Intel, Faggin's method that Shima used was to design all logic at the transistor level, directly and manually, not at the gate and/or register level. The schematics were thus hard to read, but as transistors were drawn in such a way that they suggested a "floorplan" of the chip, it helped when making the physical chip layout. However, according to Shima, the logic was first tested on breadboards using transistor–transistor logic (TTL) chips, before being manually translated into MOS transistor equivalents.

After returning to Japan, Shima founded the Intel Japan Design Center in 1980, and VM Technology Corporation in 1986. At VM, he developed the 16-bit microprocessor VM860 and 32-bit microprocessor VM 8600 for the Japanese word processor market. He became a professor at the University of Aizu in 2000.

== Prizes ==
- 1997 Kyoto Prize (Advanced Technology)
- 2009 Fellow of the Computer History Museum "for his work as part of the team that developed the Intel 4004, the world's first commercial microprocessor."

== See also ==
- List of pioneers in computer science
