= Federico Faggin =

Italian-American physicist and inventor (born 1941)

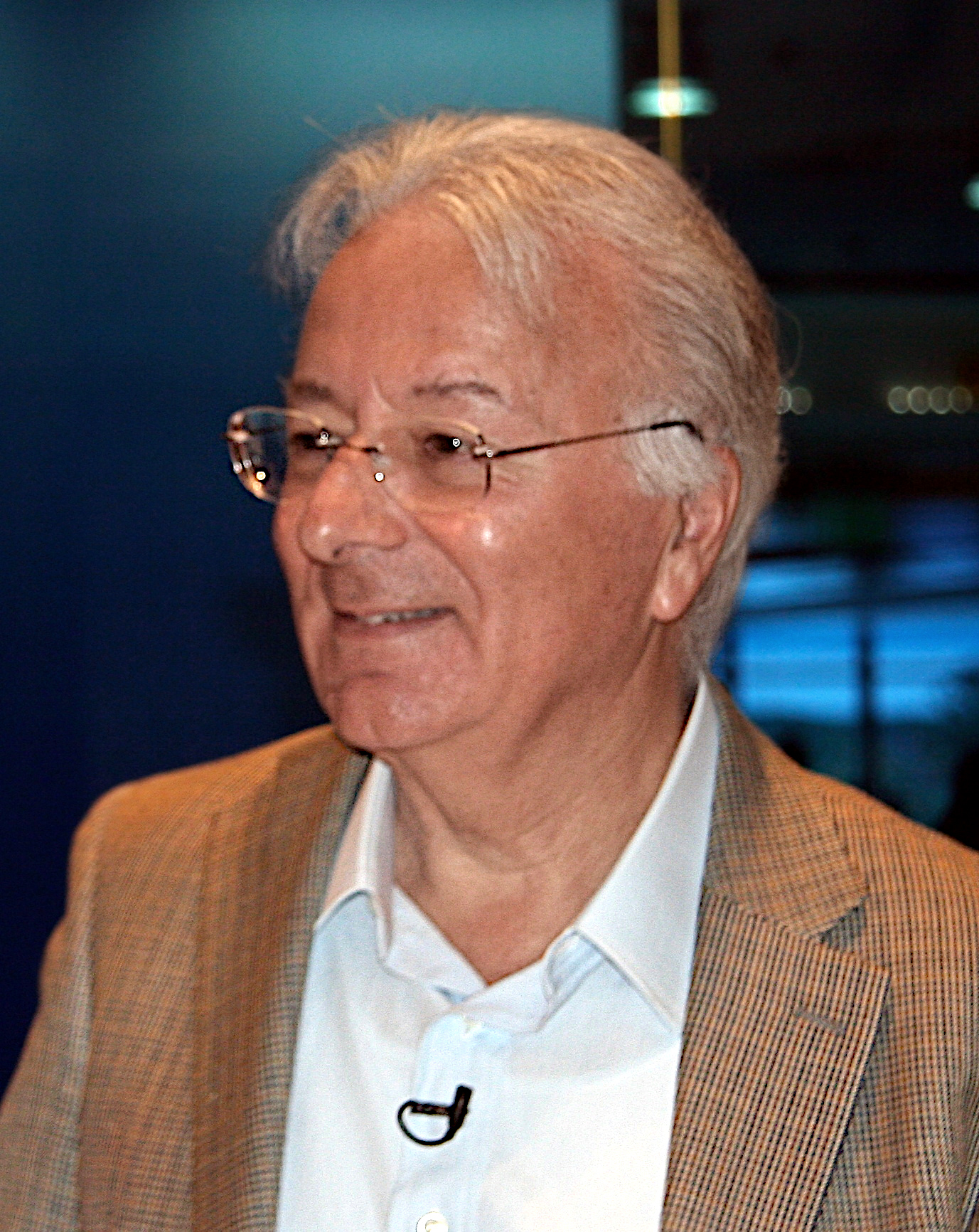
- Faggin in September 2011
- Born: 1 December 1941 (age 84); Vicenza, Italy
- Citizenship: Italy; United States
- Education: University of Padua (laurea)
- Known for: MOS silicon-gate technology; Intel 4004; Intel 8008; Intel 8080; Zilog Z80; Synaptics Touchpad; Touchscreen
- Children: 3
- Awards: Marconi Prize (1988); W. Wallace McDowell Award (1994); Kyoto Prize (1997); National Medal of Technology and Innovation (2009); Computer History Museum Fellow (2009); Enrico Fermi Prize by IFS (2014)
- Scientific career
- Fields: Physics; electrical engineering
- Workplaces: SGS-Fairchild; Fairchild Semiconductor; Intel; Zilog; Synaptics; Foveon

Federico Faggin (Italian pronunciation: [fedeˈriːko fadˈdʒin], Venetian: [faˈdʒiŋ]; born 1 December 1941) is an Italian-American physicist, engineer, inventor and entrepreneur. He is best known for designing the first commercial microprocessor, the Intel 4004. He led the 4004 (MCS-4) project and the design group during the first five years of Intel's microprocessor effort. Faggin also created, while working at Fairchild Semiconductor in 1968, the self-aligned MOS (metal–oxide–semiconductor) silicon-gate technology (SGT), which made possible MOS semiconductor memory chips, CCD image sensors, and the microprocessor. After the 4004, he led development of the Intel 8008 and 8080, using his SGT methodology for random logic chip design, which was essential to the creation of early Intel microprocessors. He was co-founder (with Ralph Ungermann) and CEO of Zilog, the first company solely dedicated to microprocessors, and led the development of the Zilog Z80 and Z8 processors. He was later the co-founder and CEO of Cygnet Technologies, and then Synaptics.

In 2010, he received the 2009 National Medal of Technology and Innovation, the highest honor the United States confers for achievements related to technological progress. In 2011, Faggin founded the Federico and Elvia Faggin Foundation to support the scientific study of consciousness at US universities and research institutes. In 2015, the Faggin Foundation helped to establish a $1 million endowment for the Faggin Family Presidential Chair in the Physics of Information at UC Santa Cruz to promote the study of "fundamental questions at the interface of physics and related fields including mathematics, complex systems, biophysics, and cognitive science, with the unifying theme of information in physics."

== Early life and education ==
Federico Faggin was born on 1 December 1941 in Vicenza, Italy, and grew up in an intellectual environment. His father, Giuseppe Faggin, was a scholar who wrote many academic books and translated, with commentaries, the Enneads of Plotinus from the original Greek into modern Italian. Federico had a strong interest in technology from an early age. He attended a technical high school in Vicenza, I.T.I.S. Alessandro Rossi, and later earned a laurea degree in physics, summa cum laude, from the University of Padua.

== Career ==
=== Olivetti R&D Labs ===
Faggin joined Olivetti at the age of 19. There he co-designed and led the implementation of a small digital transistor computer with 4 K × 12 bit of magnetic memory (1960). The Olivetti R&D department subsequently developed one of the world's first programmable desktop electronic calculators, the Olivetti Programma 101 (1964). After this first work experience, Faggin studied physics at the University of Padua and taught the electronics laboratory course for 3rd year physics students in the academic year 1965–1966.

=== SGS-Fairchild ===
In 1967, Faggin joined SGS-Fairchild, an Italy-based joint venture between the Italian company Società Generale Semiconduttori and the American firm Fairchild Semiconductor. There, he pioneered the MOS metal-gate process technology and designed the first two commercial MOS integrated circuits. Impressed by his achievements, the company transferred Faggin to Fairchild's Palo Alto, California offices in February 1968. When Fairchild exited the joint venture, he accepted a job offer to stay on with Fairchild.

=== Fairchild Semiconductor ===
In Palo Alto, Faggin led the development of silicon-gate technology (SGT), designing its unique process architecture. SGT, a MOSFET with a silicon self-aligned gate, became one of the most transformative advancements in microelectronics.

SGT laid the foundation for all modern NMOS and CMOS integrated circuits. It enabled key innovations, including MOS semiconductor memory chips, the first microprocessor, and the first CCD and EPROM with floating silicon gates. Replacing the earlier metal-gate MOS technology, SGT was rapidly adopted worldwide, and within a decade, it rendered bipolar transistors-based integrated circuits obsolete.

=== Fairchild 3708 ===
At Fairchild, Faggin designed the first commercial integrated circuit using silicon-gate technology with self-aligned MOSFET transistors: the Fairchild 3708. The 3708 was an 8-bit analog multiplexer with decoding logic, replacing the equivalent Fairchild 3705 that used metal-gate technology. The 3708 was 5 times faster, had 100 times less junction leakage and was much more reliable than the 3705, demonstrating the superiority of SGT over metal-gate MOS. See also: Faggin, F., Klein T. (1969). "A Faster Generation of MOS Devices With Low Threshold Is Riding The Crest of the New Wave, Silicon-Gate IC's". Electronics, 29 Sep. 1969.

=== Intel ===
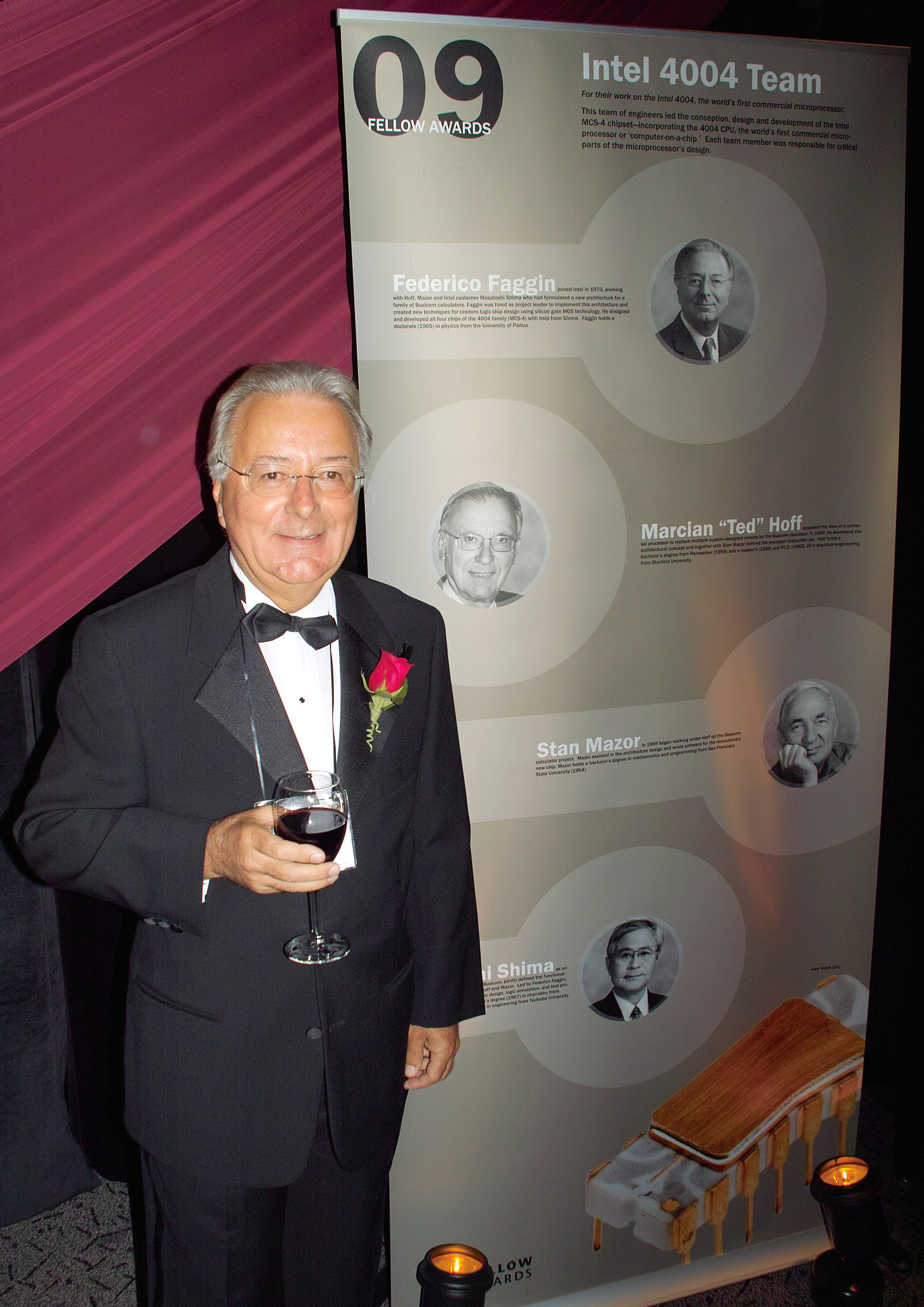
Faggin at the Computer History Museum's 2009 Fellows Award event

Federico Faggin joined Intel from Fairchild in 1970 as the project leader and designer of the MCS-4 family of microprocessors, which included the 4004, the world's first single-chip microprocessor. Fairchild was not taking advantage of the SGT and Faggin wanted to use his new technology to design advanced chips.

The 4004 (1971) was made possible by the advanced capabilities of the silicon gate technology (SGT) being enhanced through the novel random logic chip design methodology that Faggin created at Intel. It was this new methodology, together with his several design innovations, that allowed him to fit the microprocessor in one small chip. A single-chip microprocessor – an idea that was expected to occur many years in the future – became possible in 1971 by using SGT with two additional innovations: (1) "buried contacts" that doubled the circuit density, and (2) the use of bootstrap loads with 2-phase clocks—previously considered impossible with SGT— that improved the speed 5 times, while reducing the chip area by half compared with metal-gate MOS.

The design methodology created by Faggin was utilized for the implementation of all Intel's early microprocessors and later also for Zilog's Z80.

The Intel 4004 – a 4-bit CPU (central processing unit) on a single chip – was a member of a family of 4 custom chips designed for Busicom, a Japanese calculator manufacturer. The other members of the family (constituting the MCS-4 family) were: the 4001, a 2k-bit metal-mask programmable ROM with programmable input-output lines; the 4002, a 320-bit dynamic RAM with a 4-bit output port; and the 4003, a 10-bit serial input and serial/parallel output, static shift register to use as an I/O expander. Faggin promoted the idea of broadly marketing the MCS-4 to customers other than Busicom by showing Intel management how customers could design a control system using the 4004. He designed and built a 4004 tester using the 4004 as the controller of the tester, thus convincing Bob Noyce to renegotiate the exclusivity clause with Busicom that didn't allow Intel to sell the MCS-4 line to other customers.

In 2009, the four contributors to the 4004 were inducted as Fellows of the Computer History Museum. Ted Hoff, head of Application Research Department, formulated the architectural proposal and the instruction set with assistance from Stan Mazor and working in conjunction with Busicom's Masatoshi Shima. However, none of them was a chip designer and none was familiar with the new Silicon Gate Technology (SGT). The silicon design was the essential missing ingredient to making a microprocessor since everything else was already known. Federico Faggin led the project in a different department without Hoff's and Mazor's involvement. Faggin had invented the original SGT at Fairchild Semiconductor in 1968 and provided additional refinements and inventions to make possible the implementation of the 4004 in a single chip. With routine help from Shima, Faggin completed the chip design in January 1971.

The Intel 2102A is a redesign of the Intel 2102 static RAM, where Federico Faggin introduced to Intel, for the first time, the depletion load, combining the silicon gate technology with ionic implantation. The design was done toward the end of 1973 by Federico Faggin and Dick Pashley. The 2102A was 5 times faster than the 2102, opening a new direction for Intel.

=== Early Intel microprocessors ===
Faggin's silicon design methodology was used for implementing all Intel's early microprocessors.

The Intel 8008 was the world's first single-chip 8-bit CPU and, like the 4004, was built with p-channel SGT. The 8008 development was originally assigned to Hal Feeney in March 1970 but was suspended until the 4004 was completed. It was resumed in January 1971 under Faggin's direction utilizing the basic circuits and methodology he had developed for the 4004, with Hal Feeney doing the chip design. The CPU architecture of the 8008 was originally created by CTC Inc. for the Datapoint 2200 intelligent terminal, in which it was implemented in discrete IC logic.

The Intel 4040 microprocessor (1974) was a much improved, machine-code-compatible version of the 4004 CPU allowing it to interface directly with standard memories and I/O devices. Federico Faggin created the architecture of the 4040 and supervised Tom Innes who did the design work.

The 8080 microprocessor (1974) was the first high-performance 8-bit microprocessor in the market, using the faster n-channel SGT. The 8080 was conceived and architected by Faggin, and designed by Masatoshi Shima under Faggin's supervision. The 8080 was a major improvement over the 8008 architecture, yet it retained software compatibility with it. It was much faster and easier to interface to external memory and I/O devices than the 8008. The high performance and low cost of the 8080 let developers use microprocessors for many new applications, including the forerunners of the personal computer.

When Faggin left Intel at the end of 1974 to found Zilog with Ralph Ungermann, he was R&D department manager responsible for all MOS products, except for dynamic memories.

=== Zilog ===
The Zilog Z80 was the first microprocessor created by Zilog, the first company entirely dedicated to microprocessors. It was started by Federico Faggin and Ralph Ungermann in November 1974. Faggin was Zilog's president and CEO until the end of 1980 and he conceived and designed the Z80 CPU and its family of programmable peripheral components. He also co-designed the CPU whose project leader was Masatoshi Shima. The Z80-CPU was a major improvement over the 8080, yet it retained software compatibility with it. Much faster and with more than twice as many registers and instructions of the 8080, it was part of a family of components that included several intelligent peripherals (the Z80-PIO, a programmable parallel input-output controller; the Z80-CTC, a programmable counter-timer; the Z80-SIO, programmable serial communications interface controller, and the Z80-DMA, programmable direct memory access controller). This chip family allowed the design of powerful and low-cost microcomputers with performance comparable to minicomputers. The Z80-CPU had a substantially better bus structure and interrupt structure than the 8080 and could interface directly with dynamic RAM, since it included an internal memory-refresh controller. The Z80 was used in many of early personal computers, as well as in video game systems such as the MSX, ColecoVision, Master System. The Z80 ceased production in 2024.

The Zilog Z8 micro controller (1978) was one of the first single-chip microcontrollers in the market. It integrated an 8-bit CPU, RAM, ROM and I/O facilities, sufficient for many control applications. Faggin conceived the Z8 in 1974, soon after he founded Zilog, but then decided to give priority to the Z80. The Z8 was designed in 1976–78 and ended production in 2024.

=== The Communication CoSystem ===
The Communication CoSystem (1984). The Cosystem was conceived by Faggin and designed and produced by Cygnet Technologies, Inc., the second startup company of Faggin. Attached to a personal computer and to a standard phone line, the CoSystem could automatically handle all the personal voice and data communications of the user, including electronic mail, database access, computer screen transfers during a voice communication, call record keeping, etc. The patent covering the CoSystem is highly cited in the personal communication field.

=== Synaptics ===
In 1986 Faggin co-founded and was CEO of Synaptics until 1999, becoming chairman from 1999 to 2009. Synaptics was initially dedicated to R&D in artificial neural networks for pattern-recognition applications using analog VLSI. Synaptics introduced the I1000, the world's first single-chip optical character recognizer in 1991. In 1994, Synaptics introduced the touchpad to replace the cumbersome trackball then in use in laptop computers. The touchpad was broadly adopted by the industry. Synaptics also introduced the early touchscreens that were eventually adopted for intelligent phones and tablets; applications that now dominate the market. Faggin came up with the general product idea and led a group of engineers who further refined the idea through many brainstorming sessions. Faggin is a co-inventor of ten patents assigned to Synaptics. He is chairman emeritus of Synaptics.

=== Foveon ===
During his tenure as president and CEO of Foveon, from 2003 to 2008, Faggin revitalized the company and provided a new technological and business direction resulting in image sensors superior in all critical parameters to the best sensors of the competition, while using approximately half the chip size of competing devices. Faggin also oversaw the successful acquisition of Foveon by the Japanese Sigma Corporation in November 2008.

=== Federico and Elvia Faggin Foundation ===
Founded in 2011 the "Federico and Elvia Faggin Foundation" supports the scientific study of consciousness at US universities and research institutes. The purpose of the Foundation is to advance the understanding of consciousness through theoretical and experimental research. Faggin's interest in consciousness has his roots in the study of artificial neural networks at Synaptics, a company he started in 1986, that prompted his inquiry into whether or not it is possible to build a conscious computer.

== The theory of consciousness ==
In the book Irreducible - Consciousness, life, computers, and human nature (Essentia Books, 2024), Federico Faggin proposed a theory of consciousness according to which consciousness is a purely quantum phenomenon, unique to each of us. This theory is supported by two quantum physics theorems: the no-cloning theorem and Holevo's theorem. The first states that a pure quantum state is not reproducible; the second limits the amount of measurable information to one classical bit for each qubit that describes the state. Therefore, it is possible to postulate that a quantum system that is in a pure state is aware of its state, since conscious experiences (qualia) have all the essential properties of pure states, i.e., it is private knowledge only minimally knowable from the outside. However, the mathematical representation of the experience (the pure state) does not describe the experience, which remains private and knowable only from within by the system that is in that state. No classical machine can ever be conscious given that classical information is reproducible (program and data can be copied perfectly), while the quantum state is private. Consciousness is therefore not linked to the functioning of the body and can continue to exist even after the death of the body. The body behaves like a drone controlled "top down" by consciousness. The new D'Ariano-Faggin theory is based on the theoretical studies of Professor Giacomo D'Ariano, who derived quantum theory from principles based on information theory, and on the experiential, philosophical and scientific studies of Federico Faggin on the nature of consciousness.

== Personal life ==
Federico Faggin has a daughter, born 1970, and two sons, born 1979 and 1980, respectively.

== Publications ==
=== Articles ===
- "The Birth of the Microprocessor" by Federico Faggin. Byte, March 1992, vol.17, no.3, pp. 145–150.
- "The History of the 4004" by Federico Faggin, Marcian E. Hoff Jr., Stanley Mazor, Masatoshi Shima. IEEE Micro, December 1996, Volume 16 Number 6.
- "The 4004 microprocessor of Faggin, Hoff, Mazor, and Shima". IEEE Solid State Circuits Magazine, Winter 2009, vol.1 no.1.
- "The MOS silicon gate technology and the first microprocessors" by Federico Faggin. La Rivista del Nuovo Cimento, year 2015, issue 12-December. SIF (Italian Physical Society)
- "How we made the microprocessor" by Federico Faggin. Nature Electronics, vol. 1, January 2018. Published online: 8 January 2018
- "Hard Problem and Free Will: an information-theoretical approach" by Giacomo Mauro D'Ariano and Federico Faggin. arXiv:2012.06580 28. January 2021

=== Books ===
- Silicon: From the Invention of the Microprocessor to the New Science of Consciousness by Federico Faggin. Waterside Productions (February 2021)
- Artificial Intelligence Versus Natural Intelligence. Springer International Publishing, January 2022
- Irriducibile - La coscienza, la vita, i computer e la nostra natura by Federico Faggin. Mondadori (August 2022) "Sono convinto che quando capiremo che la fisica quantistica non descrive la realtà esteriore ma quella interiore essa cesserà di essere incomprensibile.”
- Irreducible - Consciousness, life, computers, and human nature, by Federico Faggin. Essentia Books 2024.
- Oltre l'invisibile. Dove scienza e spiritualità si uniscono Mondadori (June 2024).

== Awards ==
- 1988: Marconi International Fellowship Award "for his pioneering contributions to the implementation of the microprocessor, a principal building block of modern telecommunications"
- 1988: Gold Medal for Science and Technology from the Italian Prime Minister
- 1988: title of "Grande Ufficiale" from the President of the Italian Republic
- 1994: W. Wallace McDowell Award "For the development of the Silicon Gate Process, and the first commercial microprocessor."
- 1994: Laurea honoris causa in Computer Science from the University of Milan (Italy).
- 1996: Ronald H. Brown American Innovator Award, with M. Hoff and S. Mazor
- 1996: a Lifetime Achievement Award by P.C. Magazine for "technical excellence".
- 1996: inducted into National Inventors Hall of Fame, with M. Hoff and S. Mazor
- 1997: Kyoto Prize, with M. Hoff, S. Mazor and M. Shima
- 1997: George R. Stibitz Computer Pioneer Award by the American Computer & Robotics Museum, with M. Hoff and S. Mazor.
- 1997: Masi Civilta' Veneta Prize
- 2001: Dr. Robert Noyce Memorial Award by the Semiconductor Industry Association, with M. Hoff and S. Mazor
- 2002: Laurea honoris causa in Electronic Engineering from the University of Rome Tor Vergata (Italy)
- 2003: AeA/Stanford Executive Institute Award for Outstanding Achievement in the High Tech Industry by an Alumnus
- 2006: European Inventor of the Year Lifetime Achievement Award by EPO (European Patent Office)
- 2007: Laurea honoris causa in Electronic Engineering from the University of Pavia (Italy)
- 2008: Laurea honoris causa in Electronic Engineering from the University of Palermo (Italy)
- 2009: Laurea honoris causa in Computer Sciences from the University of Verona (Italy)
- 2009: Fellow of the Computer History Museum "for his work as part of the team that developed the Intel 4004, the world's first commercial microprocessor."
- 2009: National Medal of Technology and Innovation from U.S. President Barack Obama
- 2011: The 2011 George R. Stibitz Lifetime Achievement Award by the American Computer Museum (Bozeman, MT): "For foundational contributions to the development of the modern technological world, including the MOS silicon gate technology that led to the realization of the world's first Microprocessor in 1971."
- 2019: Knight Grand Cross of the Order of Merit of the Italian Republic from the President of the Italian Republic Sergio Mattarella

Source for the above-mentioned awards:

- 2012: Global Information Technology Award from the President of Armenia.
- 2012: Honorary PhD from the Polytechnic University (Armenia)
- 2012: Premio Franca Florio, given by Ministro Francesco Profumo and Prof. Ing. Patrizia Livreri
- 2013: Honorary PhD in science from Chapman University (CA)
- 2014: Enrico Fermi Award, given by the Italian Society of Physics: "For the invention of the MOS silicon gate technology that led him to the realization in 1971 of the first modern microprocessor."
- 2018: 2018 IEEE Italy Section Honorary Award to Federico Faggin for his outstanding contributions to the self aligned MOS silicon gate theory & technology and to the development of the first microprocessor
- 2018: 2018 AAAS Fellow by the American Association for the Advancement of Science
- 2019: PhD (Dottorato di ricerca) honoris causa in computer engineering from the University of Pisa (Italy) Università di Pisa.
- 2023: Sigillum Magnum from the University of Bologna

== See also ==
- List of pioneers in computer science
