= Tadashi Sasaki (engineer) =

Japanese engineer

Tadashi Sasaki (佐々木 正, Sasaki Tadashi; May 12, 1915 – January 31, 2018) was a Japanese engineer who was influential in founding Busicom, driving the development of the Intel 4004 microprocessor, and later driving Sharp into the LCD calculator market.

== Biography ==
Tadashi Sasaki was born on May 12, 1915, in Hamada City, Shimane Prefecture. Not much is known of Sasaki's mother. His father was a former samurai from the garrison at Hamada Castle and a teacher. Initially, Sasaki desired to study modern Japanese literature, but he was encouraged by one of his school teachers to study science. He studied electrical engineering at Kyoto University, where he graduated in 1938. After graduation, he worked for a short time on circuit design at the Electrotechnical Laboratory—a preeminent research laboratory sponsored by the Ministry of Telecommunications. This position was short-lived as the outbreak of war in Japan meant Sasaki would be recruited for wartime work. Sasaki was assigned to an aircraft maker called Kawanishi, which was based in the western Japanese port of Kobe. Sasaki did research on vacuum tubes for use in telephones, wireless, and radar. In this position, he learned about the vertical integration of technology, an experience he found to be very valuable. Additionally, Sasaki worked to develop radar technologies as well as radar technologies to aid in the war effort. This research took him to Wurzburg, Germany, where he studied anti-radar technology. He later worked in Kobe Kogyo, the first Japanese company to manufacture transistors, and then in Hayakawa Electrical Industries, where he helped to develop electronic calculators. This eventually led him to obtain American patent licences to fabricate integrated chips and thus the first commercially successful pocket calculator. His frequent trips overseas to study the latest developments in semiconductor technologies earned him the popular nicknames "Rocket Sasaki" and "Mr. Rocket".

== Intel 4004 ==
Sasaki was involved in financing the development of the Busicom 141-PF desktop calculator, which led to the creation of the first microprocessor, the Intel 4004. Sasaki attributed the basic idea to integrate the four basic parts of the calculator chipset (ROM (4001), RAM (4002), shift registers (4003) and CPU (4004)) into a single chip to an unnamed woman, a software engineering researcher from Nara Women's College, who was present at a brainstorming meeting held by Sharp in Japan in 1968. In an interview, Sasaki claimed that after meeting with Robert Noyce from Intel and arranging for Busicom to pay Intel the ¥40 million he had put into Busicom, he passed the four-division chipset concept on to Intel and Busicom, which was the basis for the single-chip microprocessor design of the Intel 4004.
