= Stanley Mazor =

American microelectronics engineer (born 1941)

Stan Mazor
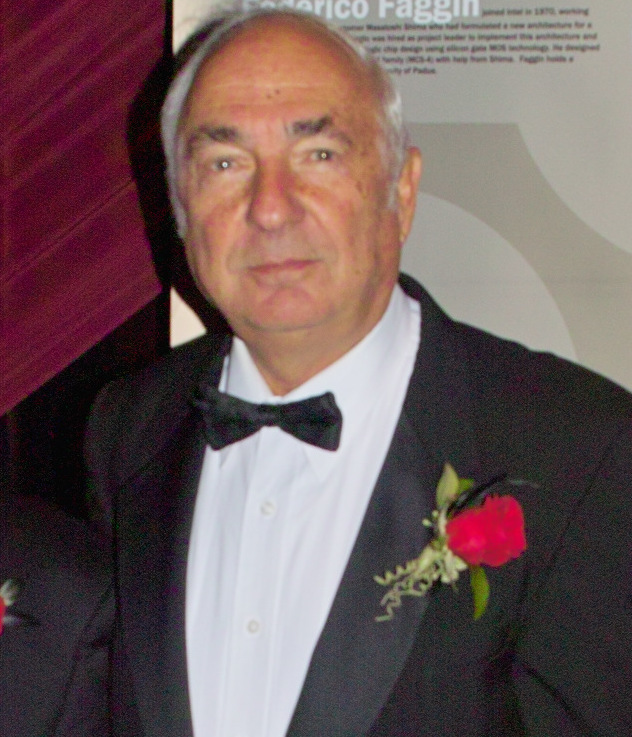
- Mazor in 2009
- Born: 22 October 1941 (age 84); Chicago, Illinois
- Education: San Francisco State University
- Known for: Intel 4004; Intel 8080
- Awards: Kyoto Prize (1997); National Medal of Technology and Innovation (2009); Computer History Museum Fellow (2009)
- Scientific career
- Fields: Electrical engineering microprocessor
- Workplaces: Fairchild (1964); Intel (1969); Stanford University; University of Santa Clara

Stanley Mazor is an American microelectronics engineer. He is one of the co-inventors of the world's first microprocessor architecture, the Intel 4004, together with Ted Hoff, Masatoshi Shima, and Federico Faggin.

== Early years ==
As a youth, Mazor's family moved to California, where he attended Oakland High School from which he graduated in 1959. He enrolled in San Francisco State University (SFSU), majoring in math and studying helicopter design and construction as a hobby. Mazor met his future wife Maurine at SFSU and they wed in 1962. Around the same time, he became interested in computers and learned to program SFSU's IBM 1620 computer, taking a position as a professor's assistant and teaching other students to use the technology. Meanwhile, he continued to study computer architecture in technical manuals outside of school.

== Career summary ==
In 1964, he became a programmer with Fairchild Semiconductor, followed by a position as computer designer in the Digital Research Department, where he co-patented "Symbol", a high-level language computer. (The "Symbol" computer was never patented as a complete unit, and the U.S. Patent Office lists only four patented sub-units: 3,643,225: Memory Control System; 3,643,227: Job Flow and Multiprocessor Operation Control System; 3,577,130: Means for Limiting Field Length of Computed Data; and 3,647,348: Hardware-Oriented Paging Control System. Mazor's name is on that last one.) In 1969, he joined the year-old Intel Corporation, and was soon assigned to work with Ted Hoff on a project to help define the architecture of a microprocessor—often dubbed a "computer-on-a-chip"—based on a concept developed earlier by Hoff. The Japanese calculator manufacturer Busicom asked Intel to complete the design and manufacture of a new set of chips. Credited along with Faggin, Hoff, and Masatoshi Shima of Busicom as co-inventor, Mazor helped define the architecture and the instruction set for the revolutionary new chip, dubbed the Intel 4004.

Although there was an initial reluctance on the part of Intel marketing to undertake the support and sale of these products to general customers, Hoff and Mazor joined Faggin, designer of the 4004 and project leader, and actively campaigned for their announcement to the industry and helped define a support strategy that the company could accept. Intel finally announced the 4004 in 1971.

After working as a computer designer for six years, Mazor moved to Brussels, Belgium where he continued to work for Intel, now as an application engineer helping customers to use the company's products. He returned to California the following year, and began teaching, first in Intel's Technical Training group, and later at Stanford University and the University of Santa Clara. Various teaching engagements took him around the world, including Stellenbosch, South Africa; Stockholm, Sweden; and Nanjing, China. In 1984, Mazor joined Silicon Compiler Systems. In 2008, Mazor was the Training Director of BEA Systems.

== Publications ==
In 1993, then working at Synopsys, he coauthored, with Patricia Langstraat, a book on chip design language entitled A Guide to VHDL. Over the course of his career, Mazor has also published fifty articles.

== Recognition ==
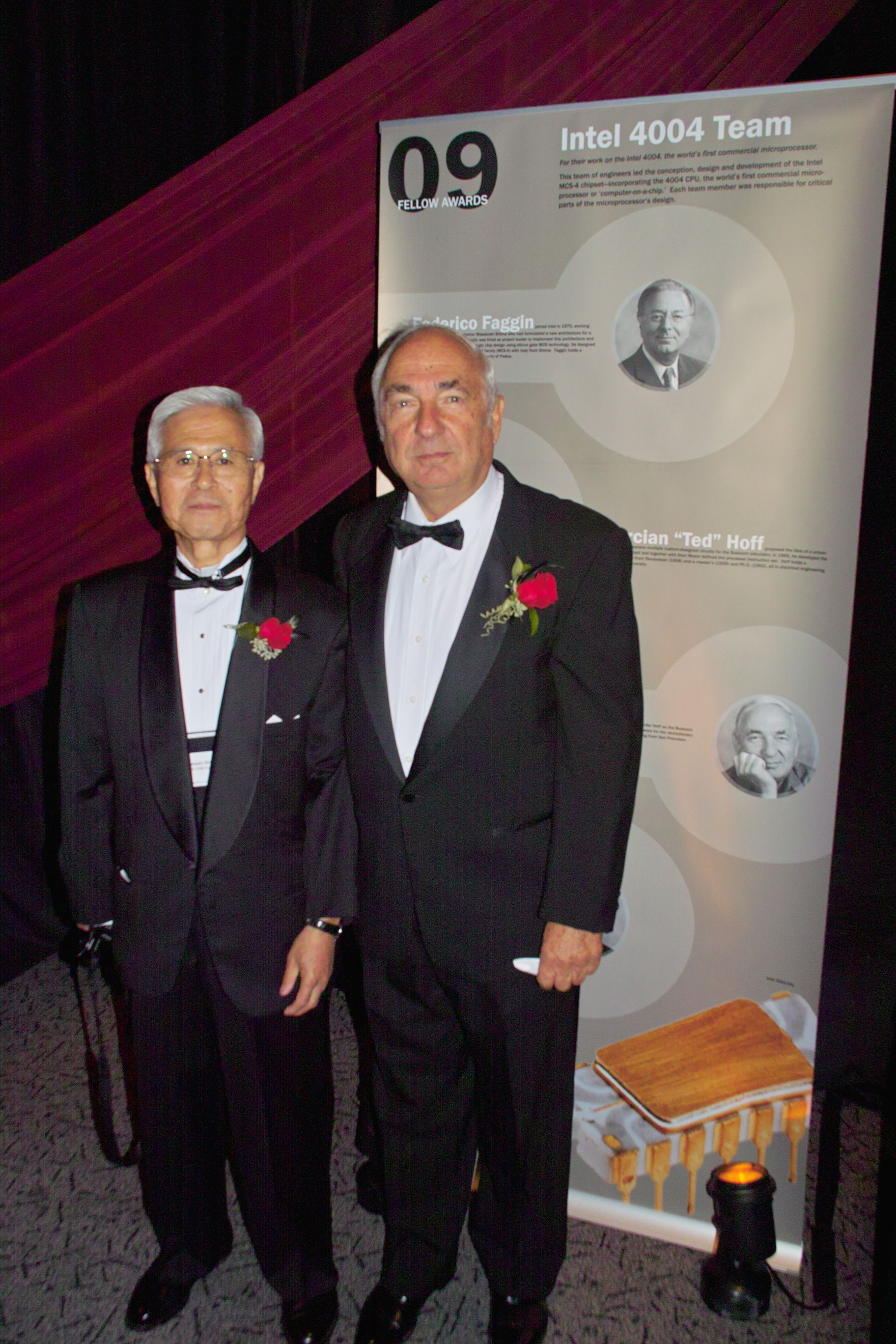
Shima and Mazor at the Computer History Museum's 2009 Fellows Award event

Along with his co-inventors Hoff, Faggin, and Shima, he has received numerous awards and recognitions, including the Ron Brown American Innovator Award, the 1997 Kyoto Prize, and induction into the National Inventors Hall of Fame. In 2009 the four were inducted as Fellows of the Computer History Museum "for their work as the team that developed the Intel 4004, the world's first commercial microprocessor." In 2010, Mazor and his co-inventors Hoff and Faggin, were awarded the National Medal of Technology by President Barack Obama.
