= Electronic News =

Defunct American electronics trade publication

Electronic News was an American trade publication covering the electronics industry. Originally published as a weekly trade newspaper, it reported on semiconductors, computers, software, communications, military and aerospace electronics, television technology, semiconductor equipment and supercomputers.

The publication is particularly associated with journalist Don Hoefler's 1971 series "Silicon Valley, U.S.A.", which helped popularize the name Silicon Valley, and with the first advertisement announcing Intel's Intel 4004 microprocessor.

== History ==
Fairchild Publications established Electronic News in 1957 as a complement to its other trade publications, including Women's Wear Daily, Home Furnishing Daily and Supermarket News.

The newspaper covered developments throughout the electronics industry, including the semiconductor sector, computing, telecommunications, software, space technology and television electronics.

In 1968, Fairchild Publications was acquired by Capital Cities Broadcasting. Capital Cities later acquired the American Broadcasting Company, which subsequently became part of The Walt Disney Company.

The publication was later associated with several publishing companies, including Chilton, International Data Group and Reed Business Information.

== Notable reporting ==
=== Origin of the Silicon Valley name ===
In 1971, journalist Don Hoefler published a series of articles titled "Silicon Valley, U.S.A." in Electronic News. The series discussed the concentration of semiconductor companies in the southern San Francisco Bay Area in northern California, including companies such as Intel, LSI Logic and National Semiconductor.

The Computer History Museum identifies the headline of Hoefler's article as the first published use of the name Silicon Valley.

The role of Hoefler's reporting in creating and popularizing the Silicon Valley metaphor has also been discussed in academic research on technology journalism.

=== Intel 4004 advertisement ===
Also in 1971, Intel placed an advertisement for the Intel 4004 in Electronic News. The advertisement appeared on November 15, 1971, and is described by the Computer History Museum as the first advertisement for a microprocessor.

The Intel 4004 became an important development in the history of the single-chip microprocessor.

== Publication format and staff ==
At different points in its history, Electronic News maintained reporting operations in New York City and other major technology and business centres in the United States. Its reporting focused primarily on developments affecting electronics manufacturers, semiconductor companies, computer businesses, communications providers and government technology programmes.

The publication operated as a print trade newspaper before transitioning toward online publication.

== End of print publication ==
The final printed edition of Electronic News was dated December 2, 2002. In an editor's note published shortly before the final issue, the publication announced that it would stop producing a print edition while continuing to provide industry news online.

Its online content was later incorporated into EDN as part of a consolidated electronics-industry news website.
