= Giacomo Mauro D'Ariano =

Italian quantum physicist (born 1955)

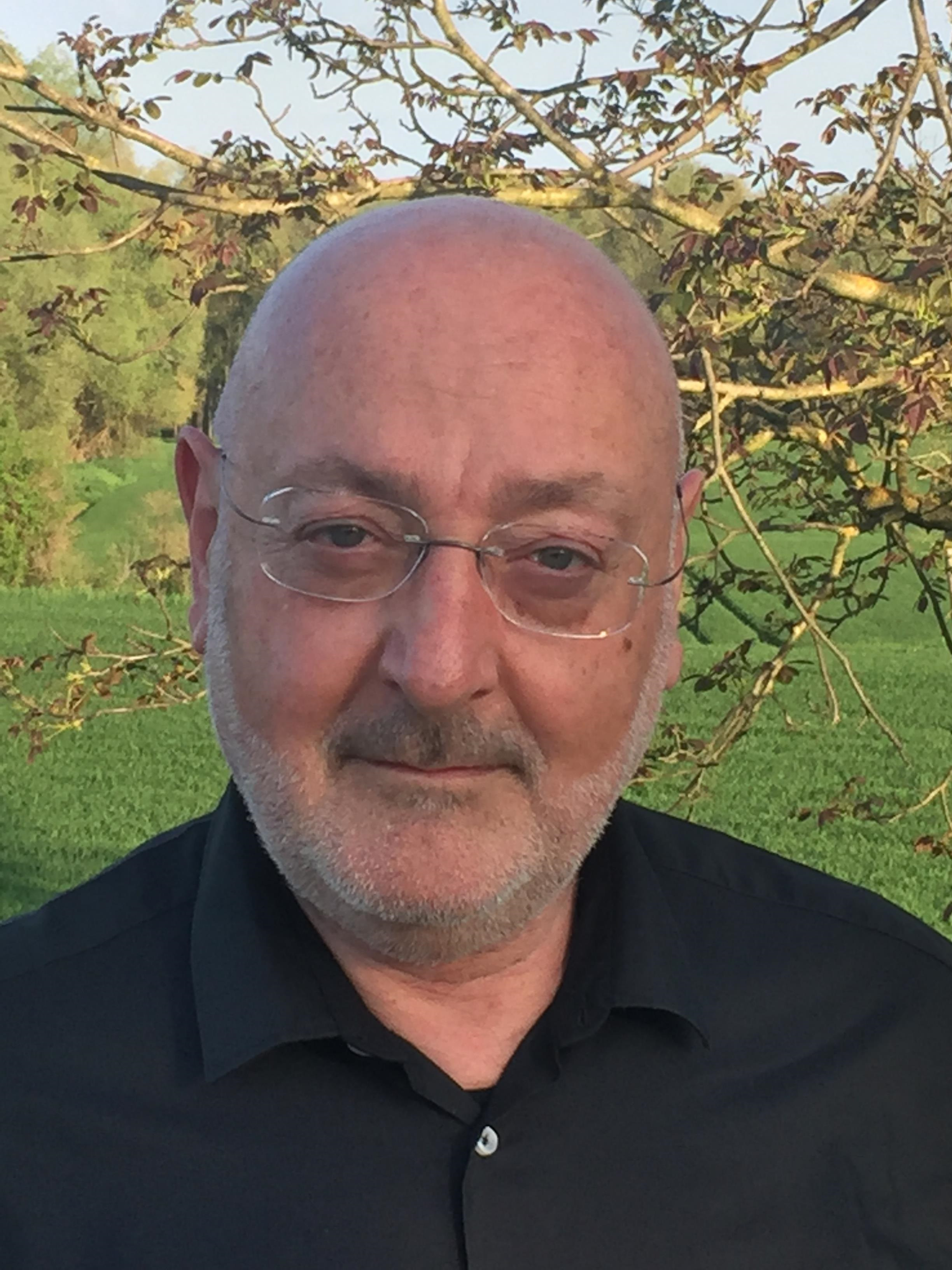
- Born: Giacomo Mauro D'Ariano; May 11, 1955; Alessandria, Italy
- Scientific career
- Fields: Theoretical physics
- Institutions: University of Pavia; Northwestern University
- Academic advisors: Ferdinando Borsa

Giacomo Mauro D'Ariano (born 11 May 1955) is an Italian quantum physicist. He is a professor of theoretical physics at the University of Pavia, where he is the leader of the QUIT (quantum information theory) group. He is a member of the Center of Photonic Communication and Computing at Northwestern University; a member of the Istituto Lombardo Accademia di Scienze e Lettere; and a member of the Foundational Questions Institute (FQXi).

His primary areas of research are quantum information theory, the mathematical structure of quantum theory, and foundational problems of contemporary physics. As one of the pioneers of quantum information theory, he has made major contributions to the informational-theoretical derivation of quantum theory.

== Early life and career ==
D'Ariano was born on 11 May 1955. He got Laurea cum laude in Physics in 1978 from Pavia University. In 1978, he started a research fellowship in Polymer Science at Politecnico di Milano and in 1979, a research fellowship at Pavia University. In 1984, he was appointed as research assistant at the University of Pavia and as a result of national competitions he became associate professor in 1992 and full professor in 2000.

At the time of his appointment, there were no PhD schools in Italy and D'Ariano became one of the first PhD supervisors in the country. He founded the Quantum Information Theory Group (QUIT) in 2000 and took on the role of the group leader. In the same year, he was also selected as a member of the Photonic Communication and Computing at Northwestern University.

== Scientific contributions ==
=== Quantum information ===
D'Ariano and his collaborators introduced the first exact algorithm for quantum homodyne tomography of states, and they subsequently generalized the technique used to do to a universal method of quantum measurement. D'Ariano then developed the first experimental scheme—now called "ancilla-assisted tomography"—that made the characterization of quantum channels, operations, and measuring apparatuses feasible to be actually done in the laboratory, by exploiting a single entangled input state.

D'Ariano proposed quantum entanglement as a tool for improving the precision of quantum measurement, an idea that, parallel to works of other authors, suggested the new field of Quantum metrology. He has also introduced several new types of measurement. With his team, he solved a number of long-standing problems of quantum information theory, such as the optimal broadcasting of mixed states; the optimal phase-estimation for mixed states, and the optimal protocols for phase cloning.

D'Ariano and collaborators introduced the concept of "quantum comb", which generalizes that of "quantum operation", and has a wide range of applications in optimization of quantum measurements, communication, algorithms, and protocols. He and his group subsequently used quantum combs to find the optimal apparatuses for Quantum tomography. The quantum-comb framework also enabled a new understanding of causality in quantum mechanics and quantum field theory. This understanding had a wide and diverse impact in several areas of research, beginning with the study of quantum causal interference and causal-discovery algorithms, used in recent attempts, along quantum informational lines, at reconciling quantum theory and general relativity, one of the great outstanding problems of fundamental physics.

=== Quantum foundations ===
D'Ariano has played a major role in making quantum information theory a new paradigm for the foundations of quantum theory and fundamental physics in general. In 2010, he proposed a set of information-theoretical postulates for a rigorous derivation of (finite-dimensional) Quantum Theory, a derivation subsequently achieved in his collaboration with Giulio Chiribella and Paolo Perinotti. This project also led to a new way of understanding, working with, and developing quantum theory, presented in a comprehensive textbook entitled Quantum Theory from First Principles.

In the mid 2010s, D'Ariano extended this program to a derivation of Quantum Field Theory from informational-theoretical postulates, which enabled him and his team to derive the complete free Quantum field theory. In an article in New Scientist, Lucien Hardy wrote that "their work and their approach is extraordinary", and Časlav Brukner wrote that he was "impressed" by their work writing that "there's something deep about quantum mechanics in this work".

A historical perspective, from Dirac's discovery of quantum electrodynamics to the present time, on this work was given by Arkady Plotnitsky in The Principles of Quantum Theory, From Planck's Quanta to the Higgs Boson. A book by Oliver Darrigol offers an extensive commentary on D'Ariano and co-workers' derivation of Quantum Mechanics, especially emphasizing how it overcomes certain ad hoc assumptions of previous derivations.

On the formulation of quantum theory based on information principles, physicist Federico Faggin based his theory on the nature of consciousness.

== Honors and awards ==
Giacomo Mauro D'Ariano is a Fellow of the Optical Society of America and of the American Physical Society. He won the third prize for the FQXi essay world competitions of 2011, 2012 and 2013. His paper on the informational derivation of quantum theory has been selected for an APS Viewpoint. In 2022 he won, together with Mikhail Lukin (Harvard University) and Andreas Winter (Universitat Autònoma de Barcelona) the International Quantum Award.

== Publications ==
- D'Ariano, G; Montorsi, A; Rasetti, M (1985). Integrable Systems in Statistical Mechanics. Vol. 1. Bibcode:1985issm.book.....D. doi:10.1142/0142. ISBN 978-9971-978-11-2. ISSN 2010-1996.
- Kumar, P.; D'Ariano, G. M.; Hirota, O., eds. (2002). Quantum Communication, Computing, and Measurement 2. Bibcode:2002qcca.book.....K. doi:10.1007/b114679. ISBN 978-0-306-46307-5.
- D'Ariano, Giacomo Mauro; Tosini, Alessandro (2010). "Space-time and special relativity from causal networks". arXiv:1008.4805 [gr-qc].
- Chiribella, G.; D'Ariano, G. M.; Perinotti, P.; Valiron, B. (14 August 2013). "Quantum computations without definite causal structure". Physical Review A. 88 (2) 022318. arXiv:0912.0195. Bibcode:2013PhRvA..88b2318C. doi:10.1103/PhysRevA.88.022318. ISSN 1050-2947. S2CID 119206411.
- D'Ariano, Giacomo Mauro; Chiribella, Giulio; Perinotti, Paolo (2017). Quantum Theory from First Principles: An Informational Approach. Cambridge: Cambridge University Press. ISBN 978-1-107-04342-8.
