= Don Hoefler =

American journalist

Donald C. Hoefler (October 3, 1922 – April 15, 1986) was an American journalist, best known for using the term "Silicon Valley" for the first time in a news story. His friend Ralph Vaerst suggested the term for a series of articles entitled "Silicon Valley, USA" in the weekly trade newspaper Electronic News, starting on January 11, 1971.

While Hoefler was the first to use "Silicon Valley" in journalism, he did not coin the phrase, which had been in use for some time. For example, a May 1970 advertisement in the Peninsula Times Tribune described a Palo Alto company that "helps production people in Silicon Valley."

== Career ==
Before working on his weekly newsletter, Hoefler was a publicist and reporter for Fairchild Publications, McGraw-Hill, RCA Corp. and Fairchild Semiconductor.

From the mid-1970s until his death in 1967, Hoefler published a newsletter called "Microelectronics News," which was the definitive "tabloid" of the emerging American semiconductor industry but was also viewed as a "gossip sheet" by some. He published this newsletter for 14 years. The Smithsonian's National Museum of American History has most issues of the newsletter available for viewing on the internet.

Hoefler began his career in electronics journalism as a publicist for Fairchild Semiconductor in Mountain View. He subsequently worked as a reporter for Fairchild Publications, owner of Electronic News, and then held editorial positions with RCA Corp. and McGraw Hill.

== Family ==
Hoefler was married to his wife Rachel Hoefler and together they lived in South San Francisco and in Cupertino during the 70s. Hoefler had been married to Louise Hoefler for 41 years at the time of her death. Louise died at the family home in Carmel Valley, Ca. in 1984. He married Rachel in 1985, shortly before his death. He was preceded in death by his son Stephen who died in 1983, at the age of 26. He had three other children that survived him, oldest son David, daughter Elisabeth, and son Paul. He was also survived by his mother Mena along with his sisters Betsy and Carol.

== Death ==
Hoefler died at the age of 63 on April 15, 1986, after a lengthy illness. Before his death, he was hospitalized for a stroke and slipped into a coma. He later died at Fort Miley Veterans Hospital in San Francisco, California. Hoefler donated his body to the University of California at San Francisco Medical School.
