= Marcian Hoff =

American electrical engineer

Marcian "Ted" Hoff
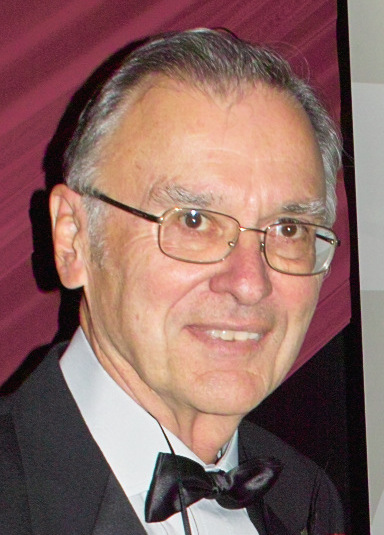
- Ted Hoff at the Computer History Museum's 2009 Fellows Award event
- Born: October 28, 1937 (age 88); Rochester, New York
- Education: Rensselaer Polytechnic Institute (B.S., 1958); Stanford University (M.S., 1959; Ph.D., 1962)
- Known for: ADALINE; Least mean squares filter Microprocessor
- Awards: Stuart Ballantine Medal (1979); Intel Fellow (the First, 1980–1983); Kyoto Prize (1997); National Medal of Technology and Innovation (2009); Computer History Museum Fellow (2009)
- Scientific career
- Fields: Electrical engineering microprocessor
- Workplaces: Intel (1968–1983); Atari; Teklicon (1990–2007)

Marcian Edward "Ted" Hoff Jr. (born October 28, 1937, in Rochester, New York) is one of the inventors of the microprocessor.

== Education and work history ==
Hoff received a bachelor's degree in electrical engineering from the Rensselaer Polytechnic Institute in 1958. He applied for his first two patents based on work done for the General Railway Signal Corp. of Rochester, New York during the summers of his undergraduate study. He received a National Science Foundation Fellowship to enroll in Stanford University, where he received his master's degree in 1959 and his Ph.D. in 1962. As part of his Ph.D. dissertation, Hoff co-invented the least mean squares filter and the ADALINE neural network with Bernard Widrow.

Hoff joined Intel in 1968 as Manager of Applications Research. He is credited with formulating the idea of using a "universal processor" rather than a variety of custom-designed chips. In 1969, working with Stanley Mazor, Federico Faggin and Masatoshi Shima, the team developed the Intel 4004, which started the microprocessor revolution.

In 1975 he started a group to work on large-scale integration for use in the telephone industry, resulting in various commercial products: first commercial monolithic telephone (named "CODEC"), first commercial switched-capacitor filter (for use with CODEC), a microprocessor for real-time digitizing analog signals (Intel 2920), and speech recognition hardware.

In 1980, Hoff was named the first Intel Fellow, which is the highest technical position in the company. He stayed in that position until 1983 when he left for Atari. After the video game crash of 1983, Atari was sold in 1984, and Hoff became an independent consultant. He then joined Teklicon in 1986 as an agent, and since 1990 as an employee.

== Popular culture ==
Hoff was featured in an Intel advertisement, calling him the "rock star" of Intel and comparing him to the rock stars of American culture.

== Awards ==
In 1954, he was one of the Westinghouse Science Talent Search (now Regeneron STS) finalists. He was awarded the Stuart Ballantine Medal in 1979, the IEEE Cledo Brunetti Award in 1980, and the Franklin Institute Certificate of Merit in 1996. Hoff was awarded the Stibitz-Wilson Award from the American Computer & Robotics Museum in 1997. He was inducted into the National Inventors Hall of Fame in 1996 and received the National Medal of Technology and Innovation in 2009 from President Barack Obama. He was made a Fellow of the Computer History Museum in 2009 "for his work as part of the team that developed the Intel 4004, the world's first commercial microprocessor." He received the 2011 IEEE/RSE Wolfson James Clerk Maxwell Award.
