= Bootstrapping (electronics) =

Startup technique in electronics

Bootstrapping is a technique in the field of electronics where part of the output of a system is used at startup.

A bootstrap circuit is one where part of the output of an amplifier stage is applied to the input, so as to alter the input impedance of the amplifier. When applied deliberately, the intention is usually to increase rather than decrease the impedance.

In the domain of MOSFET circuits, bootstrapping is commonly used to mean pulling up the operating point of a transistor above the power supply rail. The same term has been used somewhat more generally for dynamically altering the operating point of an operational amplifier (by shifting both its positive and negative supply rail) in order to increase its output voltage swing (relative to the ground). In the sense used in this paragraph, bootstrapping an operational amplifier means "using a signal to drive the reference point of the op-amp's power supplies". A more sophisticated use of this rail bootstrapping technique is to alter the non-linear C/V characteristic of the inputs of a JFET op-amp in order to decrease its distortion.

== Input impedance ==
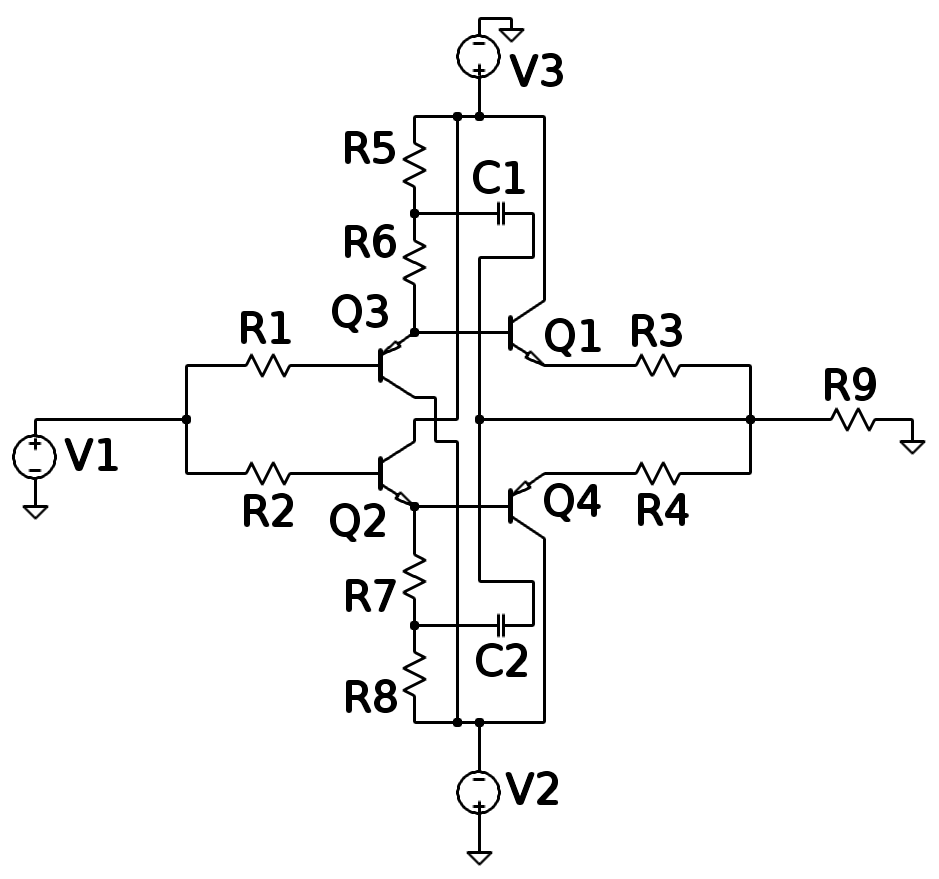
Bootstrap capacitors C1 and C2 in a BJT emitter follower circuit

In analog circuit designs, a bootstrap circuit is an arrangement of components deliberately intended to alter the input impedance of a circuit. Usually it is intended to increase the impedance, by using a small amount of positive feedback, usually over two stages. This was often necessary in the early days of bipolar transistors, which inherently have quite a low input impedance. Because the feedback is positive, such circuits can suffer from poor stability and noise performance compared to ones that don't bootstrap.

Negative feedback may alternatively be used to bootstrap an input impedance, causing the apparent impedance to be reduced. This is seldom done deliberately, however, and is normally an unwanted result of a particular circuit design. A well-known example of this is the Miller effect, in which an unavoidable feedback capacitance appears increased (i.e. its impedance appears reduced) by negative feedback. One popular case where this is done deliberately is the Miller compensation technique for providing a low-frequency pole inside an integrated circuit. To minimize the size of the necessary capacitor, it is placed between the input and an output which swings in the opposite direction. This bootstrapping makes it act like a larger capacitor to ground.

== Driving MOS transistors ==
An N-MOSFET/IGBT needs a significantly positive charge (V_{GS} > V_{th}) applied to the gate in order to turn on. Using only N-channel MOSFET/IGBT devices is a common cost reduction method due largely to die size reduction (there are other benefits as well). However, using nMOS devices in place of pMOS devices means that a voltage higher than the power rail supply (V+) is needed in order to bias the transistor into linear operation (minimal current limiting) and thus avoid significant heat loss.

A bootstrap capacitor is connected from the supply rail (V+) to the output voltage. Usually the source terminal of the N-MOSFET is connected to the cathode of a recirculation diode allowing for efficient management of stored energy in the typically inductive load (See Flyback diode). Due to the charge storage characteristics of a capacitor, the bootstrap voltage will rise above (V+) providing the needed gate drive voltage.

A bootstrap circuit is often used in each half-bridge of an all-N-MOSFET H-bridge. When the low-side N-FET is on, current from the power rail (V+) flows through the bootstrap diode and charges the bootstrap capacitor through that low-side N-FET. When the low-side N-FET turns off, the low side of the bootstrap capacitor remains connected to the source of the high-side N-FET, and the capacitor discharges some of its energy driving the gate of the high-side N-FET to a voltage sufficiently above V+ to turn the high-side N-FET fully on; while the bootstrap diode blocks that above-V+ voltage from leaking back to the power rail V+.

A MOSFET/IGBT is a voltage-controlled device which, in theory, will not have any gate current. This makes it possible to utilize the charge inside the capacitor for control purposes. However, eventually the capacitor will lose its charge due to parasitic gate current and non-ideal (i.e. finite) internal resistance, so this scheme is only used where there is a steady pulse present. This is because the pulsing action allows for the capacitor to discharge (at least partially if not completely). Most control schemes that use a bootstrap capacitor force the high side driver (N-MOSFET) off for a minimum time to allow for the capacitor to refill. This means that the duty cycle will always need to be less than 100% to accommodate for the parasitic discharge unless the leakage is accommodated for in another manner.

== Switch-mode power supplies ==
In switch-mode power supplies, the control circuits are powered from the output. To start the power supply, a leakage resistance can be used to trickle-charge the supply rail for the control circuit to start it oscillating. This approach is less costly and simpler than providing a separate linear power supply just to start the regulator circuit.

== Output swing ==
AC amplifiers can use bootstrapping to increase output swing. A capacitor (usually referred as bootstrap capacitor) is connected from the output of the amplifier to the bias circuit, providing bias voltages that exceed the power supply voltage. Emitter followers can provide rail-to-rail output in this way, which is a common technique in class AB audio amplifiers.

== Digital integrated circuits ==
Within an integrated circuit a bootstrap method is used to allow internal address and clock distribution lines to have an increased voltage swing. The bootstrap circuit uses a coupling capacitor, formed from the gate/source capacitance of a transistor, to drive a signal line to slightly greater than the supply voltage.

Some all-pMOS integrated circuits such as the Intel 4004 and the Intel 8008 use that 2-transistor "bootstrap load" circuit.

== See also ==
- Miller theorem applications (creating a virtual infinite impedance)
- Booting, initial program load for a computer
