= Busicom =

Japanese company

Busicom Co., Ltd.
- Native name: ビジコン株式会社
- Romanized name: Bijikon Kabushiki-gaisha
- Type: Public (K.K)
- Industry: Electronics
- Founded: 8 August 1944; 82 years ago
- Defunct: 1974 (Bijikon); 2016 (Broughtons)
- Fate: bought by Broughtons of Bristol
- Headquarters: Taitō, Tokyo, Japan
- Key people: Yoshio Kojima (President)
- Products: Calculators and ATMs
- Website: www.busicom.com

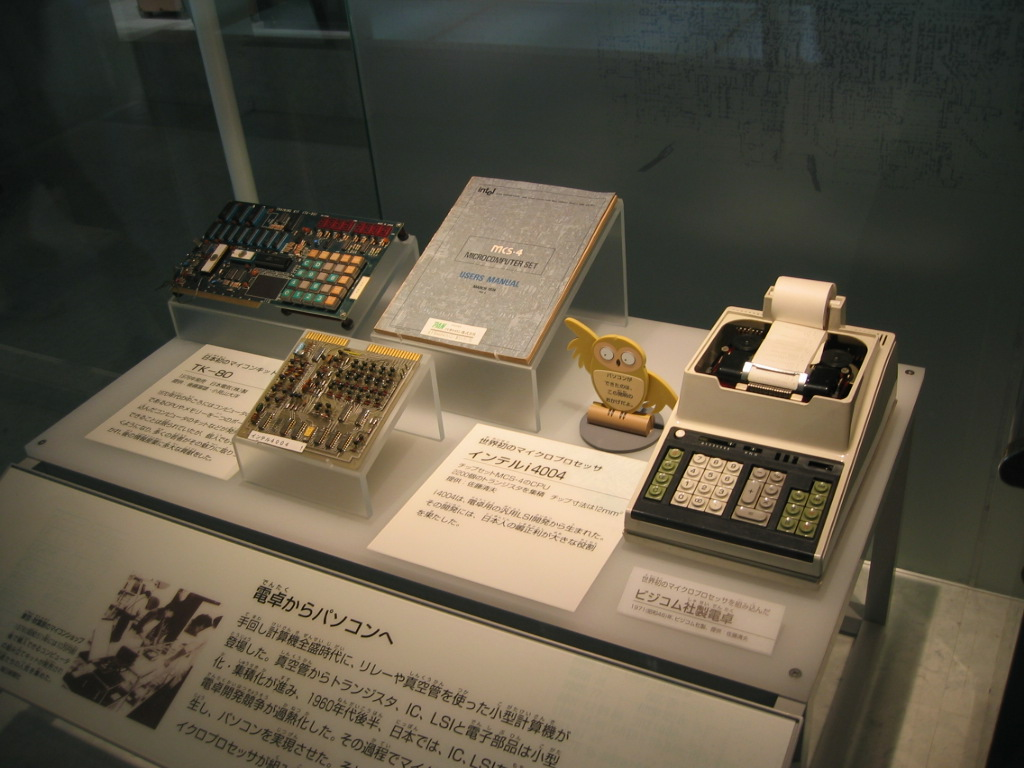
On the left, the NEC TK-80 kit, based on Intel 8080 chip; on the centre, Busicom calculator motherboard, based on Intel 4004 chip; and on the right, the Busicom calculator, fully assembled in Ueno, Tokyo

Busicom Co., Ltd. (ビジコン株式会社, Bijikon Kabushiki-gaisha) was a Japanese company that manufactured and sold computer-related products headquartered in Taito, Tokyo. It owned the rights to Intel's first microprocessor, the Intel 4004, which they created in partnership with Intel in 1970.

Busicom asked Intel to design a set of integrated circuits for a new line of programmable electronic calculators in 1969. In doing this, they spurred the invention of Intel's first microprocessor to be commercialized, the Intel 4004. Busicom owned the exclusive rights to the design and its components in 1970 but shared them with Intel in 1971.

Two other companies have done business as "Busicom" over the years: the Nippon Calculating Machine Corp, Ltd and subsequently Broughtons & Co. (Bristol) Ltd of the UK.

== Nippon Calculating Machine Corporation, Ltd ==
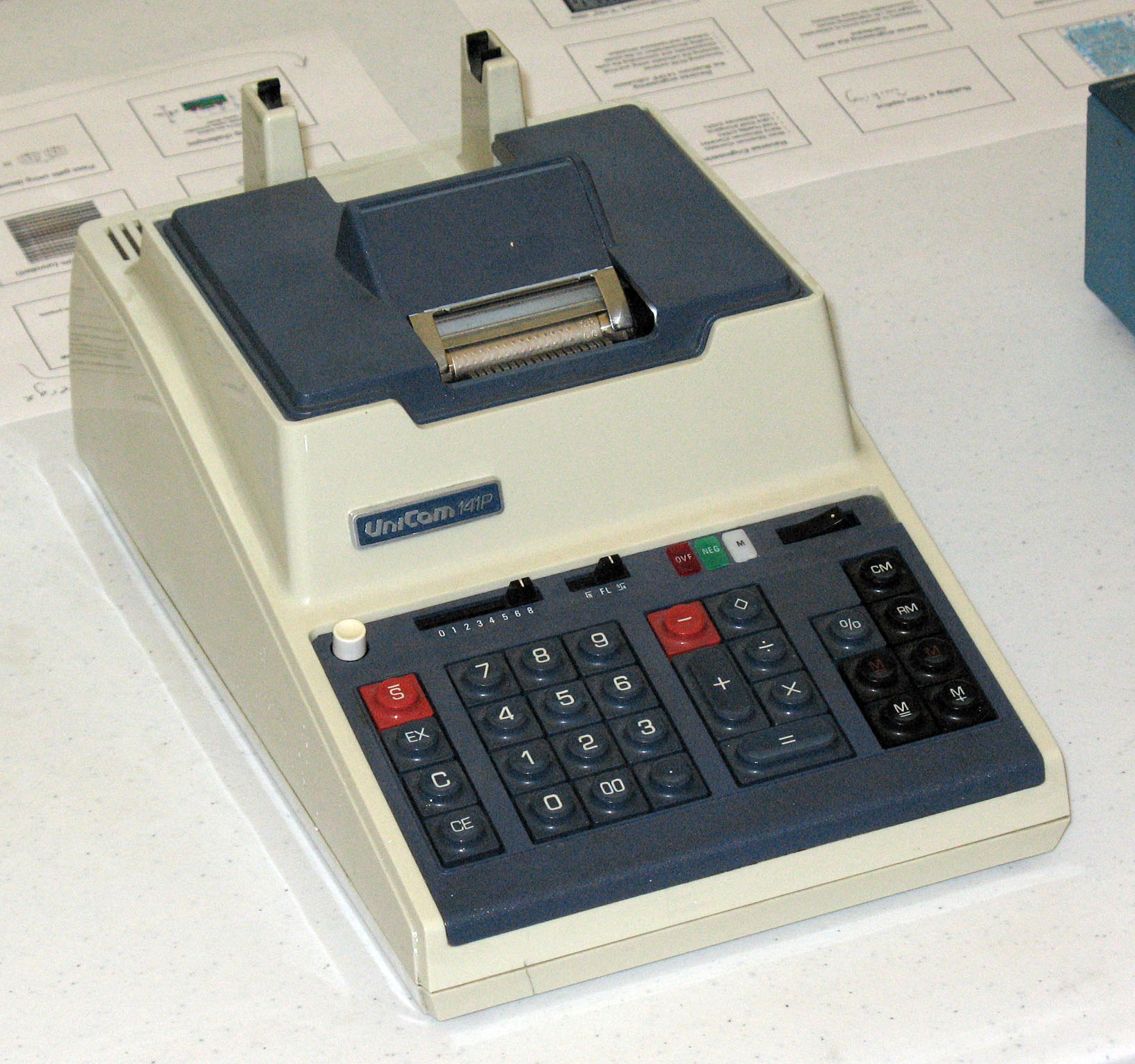
The Unicom 141P and the NCR 18-36 were OEM versions of the Busicom 141-PF.

=== History ===
The Nippon Calculating Machine Corp was incorporated in 1945 and changed its name in 1967 to Business Computer Corporation, Busicom. Due to a recession in Japan in 1974 (see 1973–1975 recession), Busicom became the first major Japanese company in the calculator industry to fail. Originally, they made Odhner type mechanical calculators and then moved on to electronic calculators always using state of the art designs. They made the first calculator with a microprocessor for their top-of-the-line machines and they were the first to make calculators with an all-in-one calculator chip, the Mostek MK6010, for their line of inexpensive machines.

One of their last mechanical calculators is the HL-21, an Odhner type machine. Their first calculator with a microprocessor is the Busicom 141-PF. Their entry based calculators, the Busicom LE-120A (Handy-LE) and LE-120S (Handy), were the first to fit in a pocket and also the first calculators to use an LED display.

=== Microprocessor ===
In order to limit production cost, Busicom wanted to design a calculator engine that would be based on a few integrated circuits (ICs), containing some ROMs and shift registers and that could be adapted to a broad range of calculators by just changing the ROM IC chips.

Busicom's engineers came up with a design that required 12 ICs and asked Intel, a company founded one year earlier in 1968 to make solid-state random-access memory (RAM), to finalize and manufacture their calculator engine.

Intel's Ted Hoff was assigned to studying Busicom's design, and came up with a much more elegant, 4 ICs architecture centered on what was to become the 4004 microprocessor surrounded by a mixture of 3 different ICs containing ROM, shift registers, input/output ports and RAM—Intel's first product (1969) was the 3101 Schottky TTL bipolar 64-bit SRAM.

Busicom's management agreed to Hoff's new approach and the chips' implementation was led by Federico Faggin who had previously developed the Silicon Gate Technology at Fairchild Semiconductor. It was this technology that made possible the design of the microprocessor and the dynamic RAMs. The 4 ICs were delivered to Busicom in January 1971.

In mid-1971 Busicom, which had exclusive rights to the design and its components, asked Intel to lower its prices. Intel renegotiated its contract and Busicom gave up its exclusive rights to the chips.

A few months later, on November 15, 1971, Intel announced the immediate availability of the first microprocessor chipset family, the MCS-4 micro computer set (all from the Busicom design) with an advertisement in Electronic News.

== Broughtons of Bristol ==
Broughtons of Bristol was a company selling and maintaining a broad line of business machines up until they ceased operations in 2016.

They used to buy most of their equipment from Busicom and bought the Busicom trade name when Busicom went bankrupt in 1974.
