= History of electricity =

History of electricity can refer to:

- See Electricity § History for an overview
- History of electromagnetic theory
- History of electrical engineering
- History of electric power transmission
- History of electricity generation
- History of electronic engineering
