= Hugh McCulloch =

American financier and politician (1808–1895)

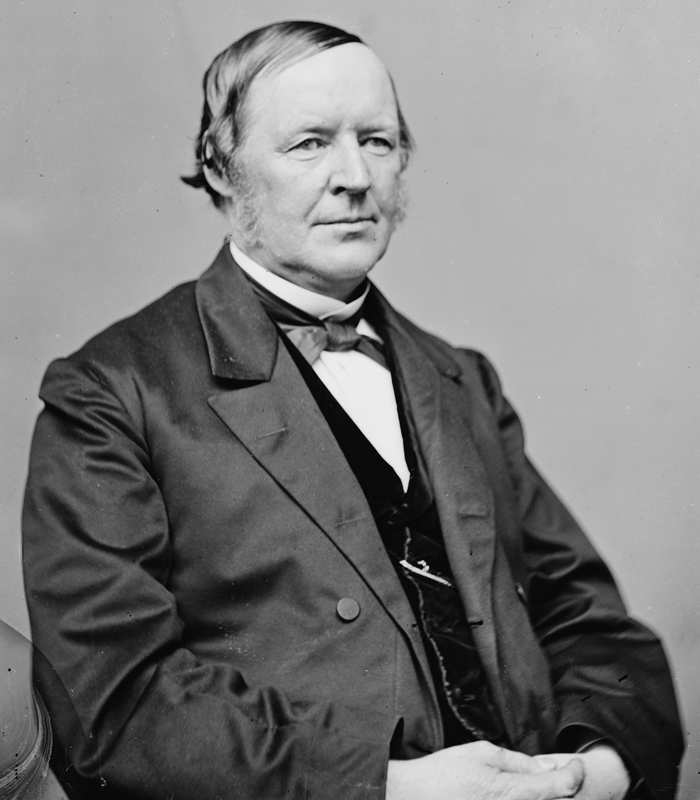
- McCulloch, 1855–1865

27th and 36th United States Secretary of the Treasury
- In office October 31, 1884 – March 7, 1885
- President: Chester A. Arthur
- Preceded by: Walter Q. Gresham
- Succeeded by: Daniel Manning
- In office March 9, 1865 – March 3, 1869
- President: Abraham Lincoln; Andrew Johnson
- Preceded by: William P. Fessenden
- Succeeded by: George S. Boutwell

Comptroller of the Currency
- In office February 25, 1863 – March 9, 1865
- President: Abraham Lincoln
- Preceded by: Position established
- Succeeded by: Freeman Clarke

Personal details
- Born: December 7, 1808 Kennebunk, Maine, U.S.
- Died: May 24, 1895 (aged 86) Prince George's County, Maryland, U.S.
- Party: Republican
- Education: Bowdoin College

Hugh McCulloch (December 7, 1808 – May 24, 1895) was an American financier who played a central role in financing the American Civil War. He served two non-consecutive terms as U.S. Treasury Secretary under three presidents. He was originally opposed to the creation of a system of national banks, but his reputation as head of the Bank of Indiana from 1857 to 1863 persuaded the Treasury to bring him in to supervise the new system as Comptroller of the Currency from 1863 to 1865. As Secretary of the Treasury from 1865 to 1869 he reduced and funded the gigantic Civil War debt of the Union, and reestablished the federal taxation system across the former Confederate States of America. He tried but failed to make a rapid return to the gold standard.

He was the last surviving member of the Lincoln Cabinet.

== Biography ==
=== Early life ===
Born in Kennebunk, Maine, he was the son of Hugh McCulloch Sr., one of the largest shipbuilders in New England, and Abial Perkins. He was educated at Thornton Academy in Saco, Maine, and attended Bowdoin College for two years, leaving due to ill health. He taught school, then studied law in Boston, and in 1833 began practicing law at Fort Wayne, Indiana. He was cashier and manager of the Fort Wayne branch of the state chartered Bank of Indiana and president of the larger organization from 1835 to 1857, and president of its successor, the privately owned Bank of Indiana, from 1857 to 1863. Despite his early opposition to the National Banking Act of 1862, he was selected by Salmon P. Chase to be the first Comptroller of the Currency in 1863. During McCulloch's 22 months in office, 868 national banks were chartered and no failures occurred. As the first Comptroller, McCulloch recommended major changes in the banking law and the resulting National Banking Act of 1864 remains the foundation of the national banking system.

=== Bank of Indiana ===
McCulloch began his banking career as the President of the Bank of Indiana. In 1833 the bank was established in response to the closure of the Second Bank of the United States. Indiana was still a wilderness, and no eastern bank was willing to take charge of the fledgling state bank. McCulloch was one of the few prominent businessmen in the young state, and although he had no banking experience, he was appointed because he was the most qualified person willing to take the position.

He ran the bank with great efficiency, making it one of the most stable in the nation. He remained president until the bank was closed in 1859, and the bank's notes were exchanged for federal notes from the new national bank. He then went on to become president of the Second Bank of Indiana, where he remained until 1865.

=== Government career ===
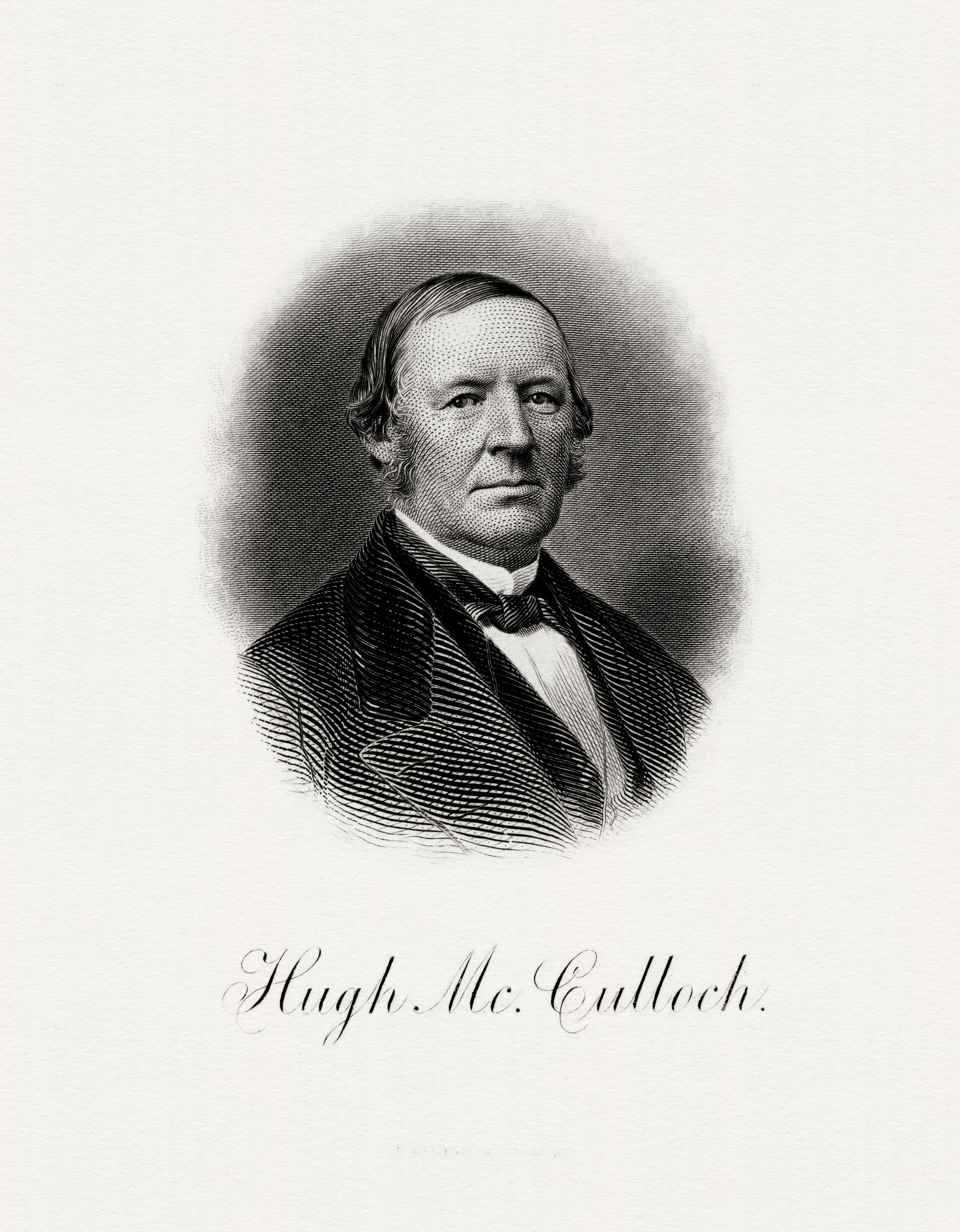
Bureau of Engraving and Printing portrait of McCulloch as Secretary of the Treasury

A day or two after his second inauguration, Abraham Lincoln invited McCulloch to his office at the White House to have a talk with him. The president offered McCulloch the position of Treasury Secretary, which he didn't expect and didn't want at first. On March 9, 1865, he was appointed as the 27th Secretary of the Treasury by President Abraham Lincoln. His appointment was largely due to his influence with existing state banks. McCulloch later remarked that on the morning of Lincoln's assassination, "I never saw Mr. Lincoln so cheerful and happy...The burden which had been weighing upon him for four long years, and which he had borne with heroic fortitude, had been lifted; the war had been practically ended; the Union was safe."

McCulloch was also with him on his death bed until his last moments. As he was about to leave the White House, Abraham Lincoln took him by the hand and said : "We must look to you, Mr. Secretary, for the money to pay off the soldiers", to which he replied: "I shall look to the people... they have not failed us thus far, and I don't think they will now". A few hours later, he saw the president becoming unconscious and saw him dying. The death bed scene was immortalized in number of paintings afterwards. He continued where it had been left by Mr. Lincoln, and served in the Presidential Cabinet of Andrew Johnson until the close of his administration in 1869.

Immediately confronted with inflation caused by the government's wartime issue of greenbacks, he recommended their retirement and a return to the gold standard. In McCulloch's first annual report, issued on December 4, 1865, he strongly urged the retirement of the legal tenders or greenbacks as a preliminary to the resumption of specie payments. However this would have reduced the supply of currency and was unpopular during the period of postwar reconstruction and westward expansion.

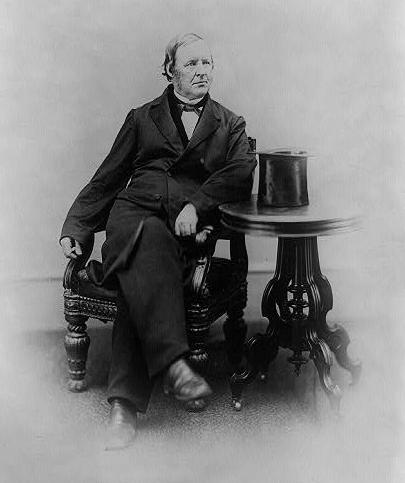
Hugh McCulloch

In accordance with this suggestion an act was passed, on March 12, 1866, authorizing the retirement of not more than $10,000,000 in six months and not more than $4,000,000 per month thereafter. This act met with strong opposition and was repealed on the February 4, 1868, after only $48,000,000 had been retired. The battle over its revival raged for the next fifty years. McCulloch was also disappointed by the decision of the United States Supreme Court upholding the constitutionality of the legal tenders.

During his tenure, McCulloch maintained a policy of reducing the federal war debt and the careful reintroduction of federal taxation in the South.

Soon after the close of his term of office McCulloch went to England, and spent six years (1870–1876) as a partner and member of the banking firm of Jay Cooke, McCulloch & Co. Their firm received from the Secretary of the Navy, George M. Robeson, the contract for the deposits made in London for the payment of naval officers abroad, with most partners being close friends of General Grant. His partner, Jay Cooke, was the chief financier of Lincoln's Union Army, and was the proprietor of America's premier banking house before his fall.

From October 1884 until the close of President Chester A. Arthur's term of office in March 1885, McCulloch again served as Secretary of the Treasury. During his six months in office at that time, he continued his fight for currency backed by gold, warning that the coinage of silver, used by then as backing for currency, should be halted.

After his death, McCulloch's portrait was used on several issues of $20 U.S. national bank notes (specifically the 1902 series).

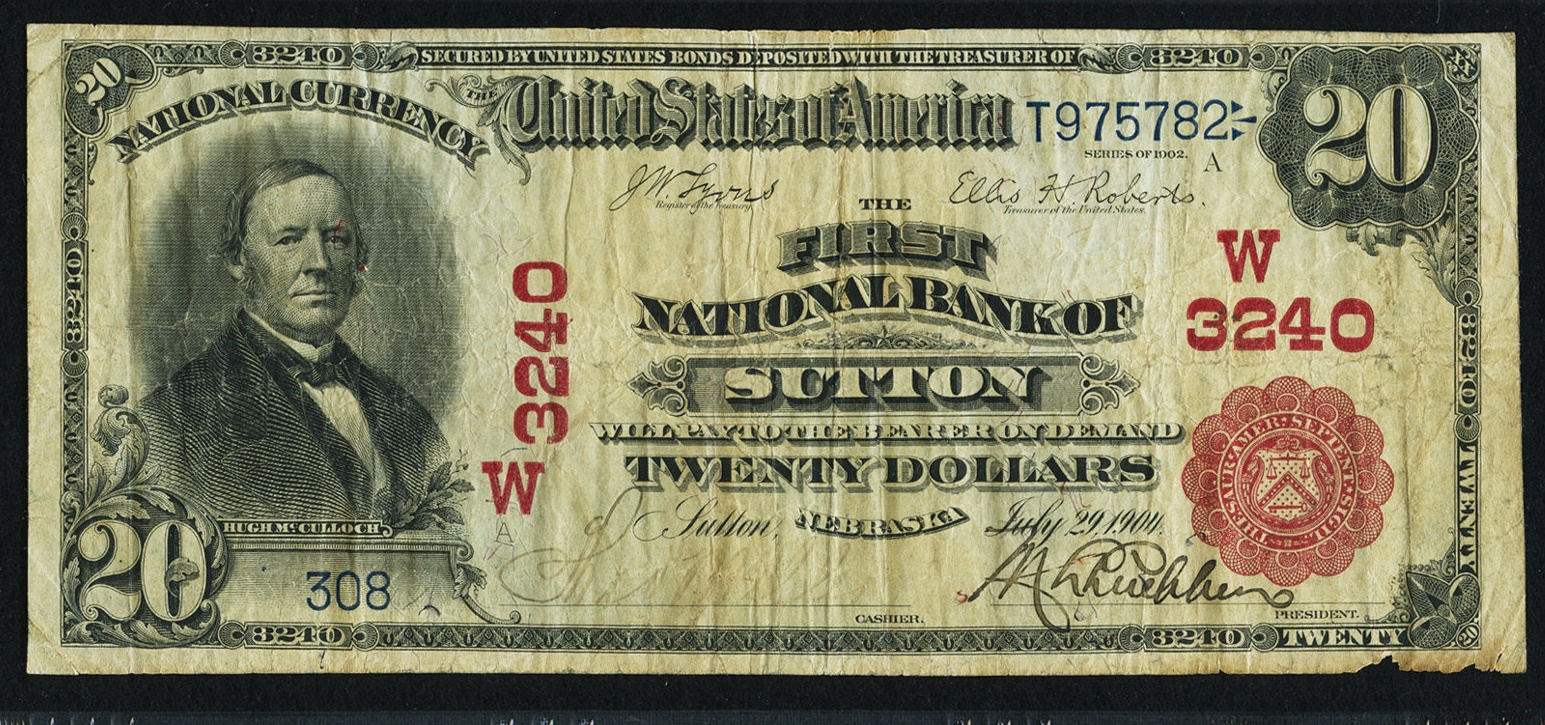
$20 banknote with McCulloch's portrait on it, Friedberg #639

=== Reconstruction finance ===
The Civil War had been financed primarily by issuing short-term and long-term bonds and loans, plus inflation caused by printing paper money, plus new taxes. Wholesale prices had more than doubled, and reduction of inflation was a priority for Secretary McCulloch. A high priority, and by far the most controversial, was the currency question. The old paper currency issued by state banks had been withdrawn, and Confederate currency was worthless. The national banks had issued $207 million in currency, which was backed by treasury bonds. The federal treasury had issued $428 million in greenbacks, which was legal tender but not backed by gold or silver. In addition about $275 million of coin was in circulation.

The new administration policy announced in October would be to make all the paper convertible into specie, if Congress so voted. The House of Representatives passed the Alley Resolution on December 18, 1865, by vote of 144 to 6. In the Senate it was a different matter, for the key player was Senator John Sherman, who said that inflation contraction was not nearly as important as refunding the short-term and long-term national debt. the war had been largely financed by national debt, in addition to taxation and inflation. The national debt stood at $2.8 billion. By October 1865, most of it in short term and temporary loans. Wall Street bankers typified by Jay Cooke believe that the economy was about to grow rapidly, thanks to the development of agriculture through the Homestead Act, the expansion of railroads, especially rebuilding the devastated Southern railroads and in opening the transcontinental line to the West Coast, and especially the flourishing of manufacturing during the war.

The goal premium over greenbacks was $145 in greenbacks to $100 in gold, and the optimists thought that the heavy demand for currency in an era of prosperity would return the ratio to 100. A compromise was reached in April 1866, that limited the treasury to a currency contraction of only $10 million over six months. Meanwhile, the Senate refunded the entire national debt, but the House failed to act. By early 1867, postwar prosperity was a reality, and the optimists wanted an end to contraction, which Congress ordered in January 1868. Meanwhile, the Treasury issued new bonds at a lower interest rate to refinance the redemption of short-term debt. while the old state bank notes were disappearing from circulation, new national bank notes, backed by specie, were expanding. By 1868 inflation was minimal.

== Personal ==
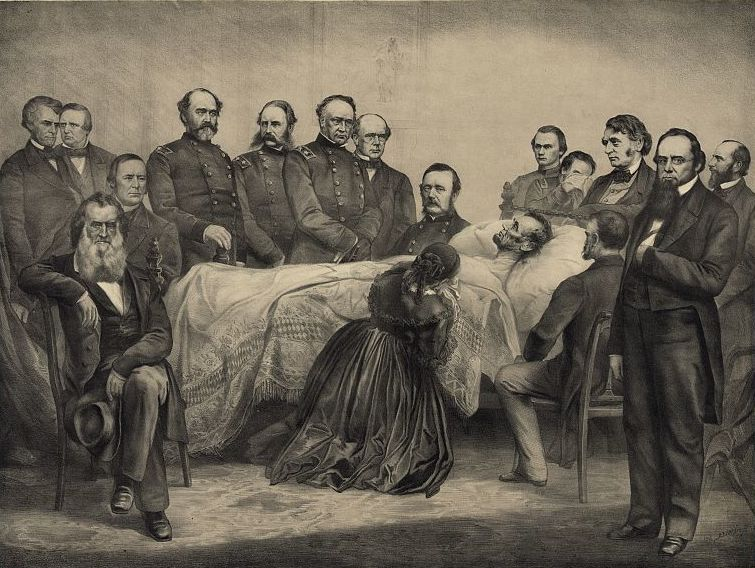
Death bed of Abraham Lincoln, April 15, 1865, Hugh McCulloch is at the end of the bed on the left, with Mary Todd Lincoln, Capt. Robert Todd Lincoln, Salmon P. Chase, surgeon Charles Leale, and others

McCulloch's first marriage, to Eunice Hardy, ended when she died young. His second marriage was to Susan Man, a schoolteacher, whom he met in Fort Wayne in 1836 when he was a young widower. Susan was the aunt of Albon P. Man, cofounder with William E. Sawyer of the Electro-Dynamic Light Company, competitors of Thomas Edison. Hugh McCulloch was an early investor in the company with James Powell Kernochan. The couple had six children. One of his daughters, Marie Louise, married to John B. Yale, son of Linus Yale Jr., and brother of Julian L. Yale, members of the Yale family.

He died at his home, Holly Hill in Prince George's County, Maryland, near Washington, D.C., in 1895 and is buried in Rock Creek Cemetery in D.C. His wife, Susan McCulloch, died at the residence of her son-in-law, John B. Yale, in 1898. Her great uncle was Naphtali Daggett, President of Yale College, and her family members included Gen. Moores, Gen. Melanchton Woolsey, Congressman and Senator Jonas Platt, and Alida Livingston, member of the Schuyler and Livingston family.

McCulloch was also a millionaire of 1892, and was featured in the book of American Millionaires of that year.

== Legacy ==
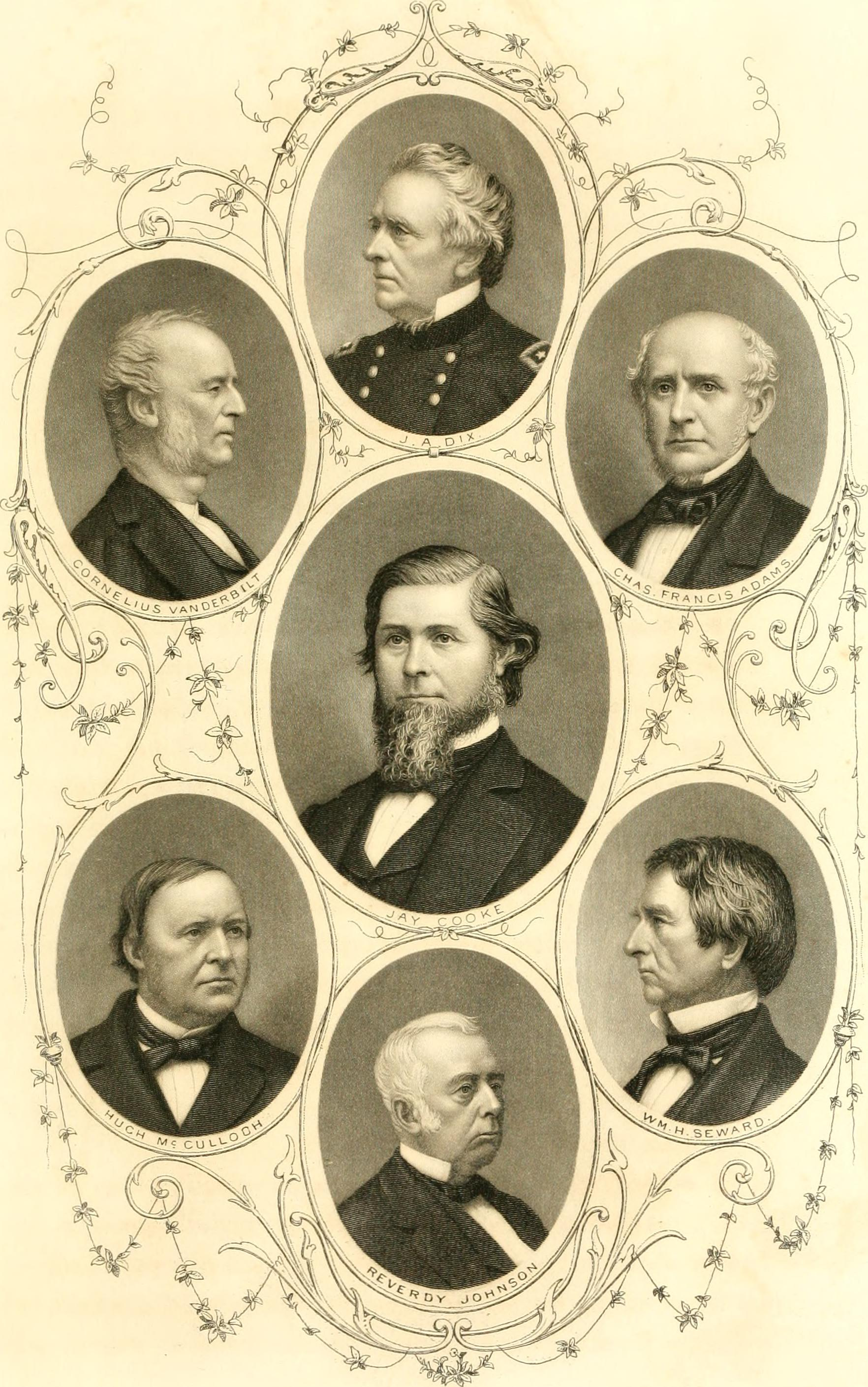
Portraits of Hugh McCulloch, Cornelius Vanderbilt, John Adams Dix, Jay Cooke, Charles Francis Adams Sr., William H. Seward and Reverdy Johnson

According to economic historian Allan Peskin, McCulloch's career exemplifies the Western pioneer as banker, and also the banker as a Christian moralist. He was well-educated but had no business or banking experience. His honesty proved an essential asset in the age of rascality and dubious paper money. His greatest challenges came in building the brand-new national banking system during the war, and afterwards refinancing the enormous Union debt. The Confederate debt was repudiated and never repaid.

The biggest puzzle was dealing with $428 million in greenbacks, in an age where McCulloch like all orthodox economists, rejected paper money. His remedy was a rapid return to specie payment using gold and silver and retiring the greenbacks. This contraction policy removed money from circulation, lowered prices, wages and profits, and put heavy pressures on debtors. The Republican Party, however, backed McCulloch's program, and his years at Treasury were highly prosperous. He left the government in 1869 to become a very rich international financier.

McCulloch Hall, a residence hall at Harvard Business School, was named in his honor.

The U.S. Revenue Cutter Service and its successor, the U.S. Coast Guard, each named cutters after McCulloch. The Revenue Cutter USS McCulloch served under George Dewey in the Battle of Manila during the Spanish–American War, and Coast Guard Cutter McCulloch served in World War II and the Vietnam War.

The chief authority for the life of McCulloch is his own book, Men and Measures of Half a Century (New York, 1888). McCulloch was the last surviving member of the Lincoln Cabinet.

His house at Fort Wayne, the Hugh McCulloch House, was listed on the National Register of Historic Places in 1980.

Political offices
Preceded by William P. Fessenden	U.S. Secretary of the Treasury; Served under: Abraham Lincoln, Andrew Johnson; 1865–1869	Succeeded by George S. Boutwell
Preceded by Walter Q. Gresham	U.S. Secretary of the Treasury; Served under: Chester A. Arthur; 1884–1885	Succeeded by Daniel Manning
Preceded by New office	Comptroller of the Currency; 1863–1865	Succeeded by Freeman Clarke
