= Electro-Dynamic Light Company =

Lighting and electrical distribution company established in New York City in 1878

Electro-Dynamic Light Company of New York
- Founded: July 8, 1878; 147 years ago
- Founders: Albon Man; William E. Sawyer
- Defunct: 1882

The Electro-Dynamic Light Company of New York was a lighting and electrical distribution company organized in 1878. The company held the patents for the first practical incandescent electric lamp and electrical distribution system of incandescent electric lighting. They also held a patent for an electric meter to measure the amount of electricity used. The inventions were those of Albon Man and William E. Sawyer. They gave the patent rights to the company, which they had formed with a group of businessmen. It was the first company in the world formally established to provided electric lighting and was the first company organized specifically to manufacture and sell incandescent electric light bulbs.

Man, an attorney from New York City, supplied money for experimentation to Sawyer, an electrical engineer. This partnership developed into the Electro-Dynamic Light Company that brought in other investors that became partners. Sawyer devised a unique electrical distribution system where electrical power could be obtained anywhere in the city from an electrical generator with the turn of a switch to light up electric lamps to produce glowing light like a gas lamp. It was unique in that it produced this power without consumers having to maintain local galvanic batteries and at a fraction of the cost of producing the same lighting as from gas lamps. Other features of the system were that safety devices were built in to prevent the early destroying of the other electric lamps in the circuit should there be a power surge due to a lamp burning up early and leaving the distribution circuit. The patents for the Man and Sawyer system were in place before any other electrical companies had similar systems.

== History ==
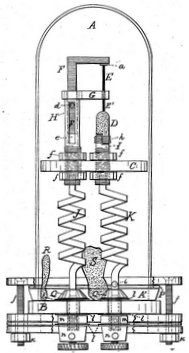
1878 filament electric lamp

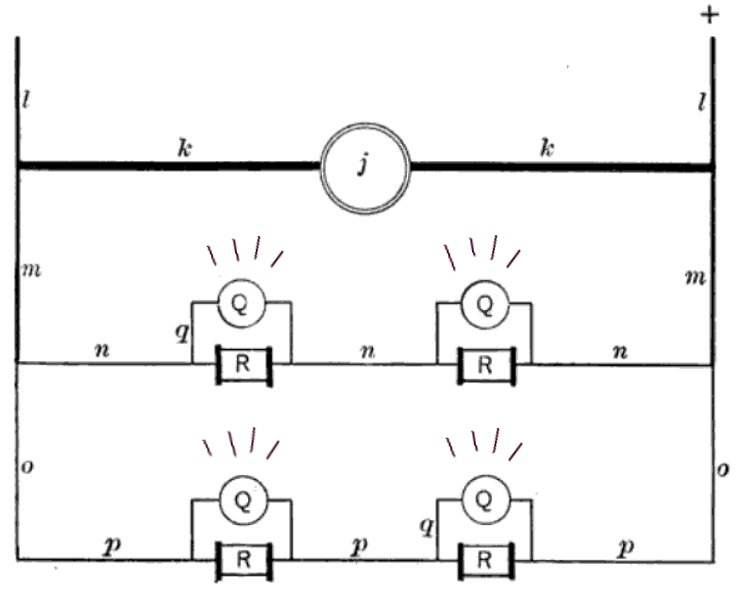
Electro-Dynamic Electric Light System shows "J" electric generator, "k" main feeder lines, "m" & "o" sub-main lines, "n" & "P" branch lines then connecting incandescent light bulb lamps "Q"

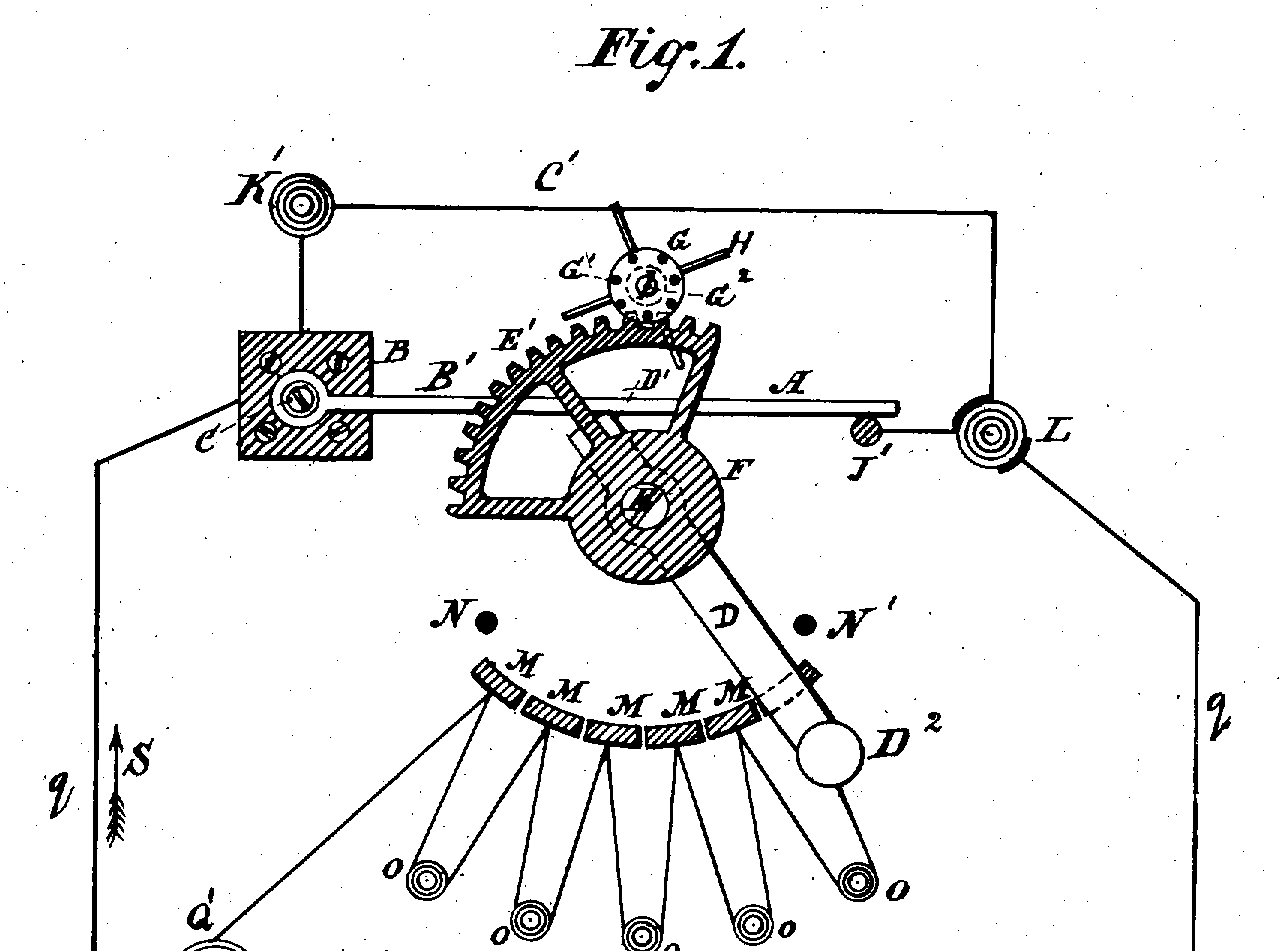
Electro-Dynamic regulation system

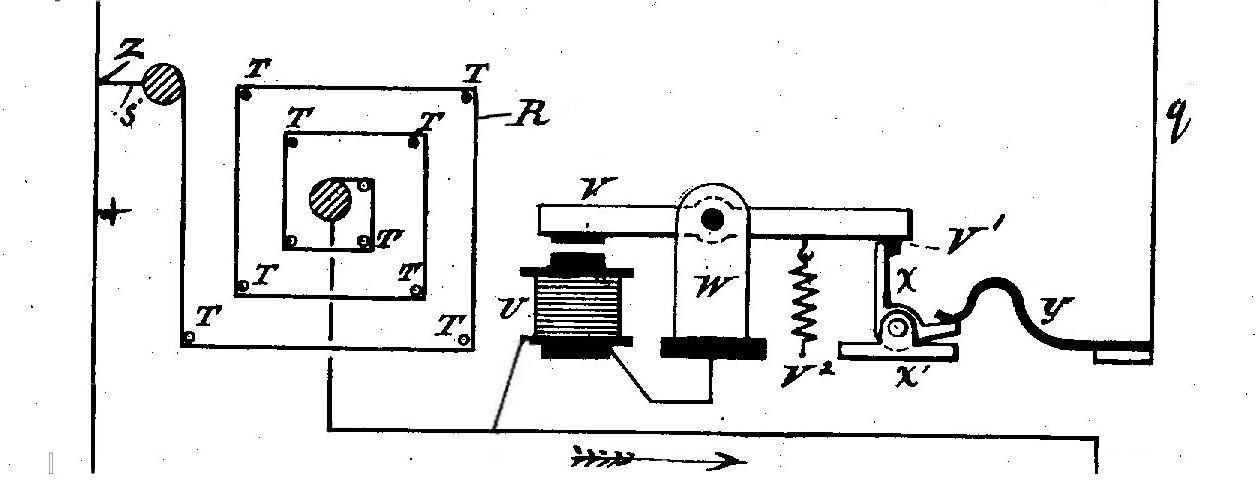
Electro-Dynamic safety switch system

Albon Man, an attorney from New York City, and William E. Sawyer, an electrical engineer, officially formed the Electro-Dynamic Light Company of New York on July 8, 1878. This was by way of a partnership with Man supplying money to Sawyer for experiments. This was the first formally established electric-lighting company in the United States and was the first company organized specifically to manufacture and sell incandescent electric light bulbs to put into a system. Man and Sawyer patented the first practical electrical distribution system for incandescent electric lighting and gave the patents to the company. The United States Electric Lighting Company was organized in 1878, weeks after the Electro-Dynamic Company. Thomas Edison's electric lighting discoveries were first shown in September 1878. The Edison Electric-Light Company of New York was organized on October 17, three months after the Electro-Dynamic Company was formally established.

The company had a patent for an electrical distribution system of which Sawyer filed June 27, 1877, and which was granted August 14, 1877. The following extracts from the specifications of his patent show the direction of his early work. The object of his invention was to supply the streets blocks or buildings of a town or city in a practicable manner with any desired quantity of electricity for the purposes of electrical illumination, electroplating, electric heating, and the running of electric motors. The strategy of the invention was to place the electrical generator in any convenient locality where there can be placed electrical wiring over or under ground to the streets blocks or buildings in which the electric current is to be utilized. The advantages of the invention was to enable householders or businesses to obtain a supply of electricity for any purposes without the care and inconvenience of maintenance of local galvanic batteries, that it reduces the cost of electricity considerably to consumers, and that it rendered practical lighting of buildings by electricity.

The object of Sawyer's invention was to supply streets and houses with electricity for local use, the same as natural gas or water was supplied to streets and houses at the present time, so that whenever electricity was desired, it was available from a switched supply. A week later Sawyer obtained a second patent for an electric lamp or burner on August 21, 1877. The invention consisted of an arrangement and combination of parts whereby it enabled to place several electric lights with carbon filaments in a single circuit and to get rid of the use of arcing carbon points normally employed in electric lights at the time. The purpose of the electric current was to heat to incandescence a filament wire in a glass bulb that had an inert gas and a glowing light resulted.

Other investor-partners of the Electro-Dynamic Company included Hugh McCulloch (Man's uncle), William Hercules Hays, James P. Kernochan, Lawrence Myers, and Jacob Hays. Sawyer was around 28 years old and Man about 52 years old at the time the company was formed. They planned on lighting New York City with electricity for one-fortieth the cost of gas lighting. The new company started with capital of $10,000 cash and $290,000 of scrip. It was formed for the purpose of the production of light and power by means of electricity for the lighting of streets and buildings. The company was to make all the equipment necessary to generate and distribute electricity. The distribution of electricity produced by the company was not only for lighting, but for other purposes as well. The company was the first in the United States specifically organized for the manufacture and sale of incandescent electric light bulbs.

In 1878, the company demonstrated an electric light that was the invention of Sawyer and Man. An exhibition was set up in New York City on October 29, 1878. The same exhibition was mentioned several weeks later in a newspaper of Princeton, Minnesota, and Bismarck, North Dakota. The lamp was described as a strip of pencil carbon graphite connected with two wires to an electric generator. The carbon strip was in a hermetically sealed glass bulb that was filled with nitrogen gas. When electricity was applied, the internal strip developed a temperature of between 5,000 and 40,000 °F (22,200 °C). Since there was no oxygen in the glass globe the carbon filament did not burn out and produced light instead when it got hot.

The demonstration consisted of five electric light bulbs hanging from chandeliers in an office building at the corner of Elm and Walker streets. Wires came from the electric lights and went to an adjacent room where there was a generator set up to produce electricity. The wires passed through keyholes to the adjoining room. A key was put into the keyhole and turned to switch on the electric current. As the key was turned further around, the electric lights got brighter. This switch idea was demonstrated with all five chandeliers with the electric lamps. An electric meter to measure the amount of electricity used in an office or house for billing purposes was also demonstrated.

What was unique to Man and Sawyer's lighting system patent No. 205,303, dated June 5, 1878, was that of a safety switch and current regulator, which was termed the lamp-lighter. Attempts to produce an electric lamp with a carbon filament had been made by others and it had been found impossible to prevent the filament from being destroyed with the application electrical current and the sudden change in temperature of the filament as a consequence of the full voltage applied at once. The lamp-lighter switch and regulator avoided this by automatically regulating the lamps electrical current.

In an electric lighting system with an electric generator supplying current to several electric lamps in a Man and Sawyer electrical distribution system there was an independent electromagnetic safety switch of the electrical current. It acted automatically upon the occurrence of any sudden change of resistance condition in the system. A sudden change could be another lamp that burned out and was no longer in the circuit or an accidental short circuit, which then produced a sudden power surge to the remaining lamps still in the circuit. The lamp-lighter safety switch would notice this and instantly turn off the electricity. Then it set up a new combination series of resistors and switched the electricity back on gradually. That regulated the quantity or intensity of the electrical current going to the remaining lamps in the distribution system so that the other lamps would not be destroyed by the sudden power surge.

== Legal ==
Patents were taken out by Man and Sawyer for the incandescent electric lamp and all the items needed for electric current distribution for electrifying a large number of lights. The patents were for the benefit of Electro-Dynamic Light Company of New York. Man and Sawyer were involved in many legal actions between 1880 and 1884 to protect these patents for electric lighting and electrical power distribution. One such patent was their invention of the incandescent electric lamp formed of carbonized paper. The patent was originally decided for Man and Sawyer on January 20, 1882. It was later referred back to the Examiner of Interferences on the request of Edison who indicated that he had new testimony to offer that was relevant and should be looked at. The Examiner of this time reviewed Edison's testimony at length and went over all the additional points. He held that Man and Sawyer must be adjudged to be the prior inventors of the electric light, as was already decided twice before. He determined after a careful reexamination of the entire record it must be held that Man and Sawyer had put into practice the usage of the electric light at least by the autumn of 1878 and that earliest date the invention can be shown put into use by Edison is a year later. This settled permanently the long contested conflict over the question of who was first in the invention of the arch-shaped fibrous carbon filament electric lamp, which occupied the attention of the U.S. Patent Office for nearly five years to make this final determination. The Electro-Dynamic Light Company was no longer in existence after 1882.

== See also ==
- History of electronic engineering

== Sources ==
- Carnegie, Andrew (15 May 2004). Success and How to Attain It. Cosimo, Inc. ISBN 978-1-59605-010-5.
- EE1890 (July 16, 1890). Electrical Engineer, Volume 10. Electrical Engineer.
- ER1890 (July 19, 1890). Electrical Review. Delano. "The United States Company was organized in 1878, a few weeks after the Electro-Dynamic Light Company,"
- NAR1889 (1889). The North American Review. University of Northern Iowa. "In September, 1878, appeared the first announcement of Mr. Edison's discoveries in electric lighting, and on October 17, three months after the formation of the Electro-Dynamic Company to operate Sawyer and Man's electric-light inventions, the Edison Electric-Light Company, of New York, was organized."
- Pope, Franklin Leonard (1894). Evolution of Electric Incandescent Lamp. Boschen & Wefer.
- United States, Patent Office (1882). Official Gazette of the U. S. Patent Office. U.S. Patent Office.
- WE1890 (July 19, 1890). Western Electrician. Electrician Publishing Company.
- World_XLV (1905). Electrical World. McGraw-Hill.
- Wrege, Charles D. (1 January 1986). Facts & Fallacies of Hawthorne. Garland. ISBN 978-0-8240-8374-8. "On July 8, 1878, Mr. Sawyer and Albon Man formed the Electro-Dynamic Light Company of New York, "The first electric lighting company ever organized""
