= Hugh McCulloch House =

Historic house in Indiana, United States

- U.S. National Register of Historic Places
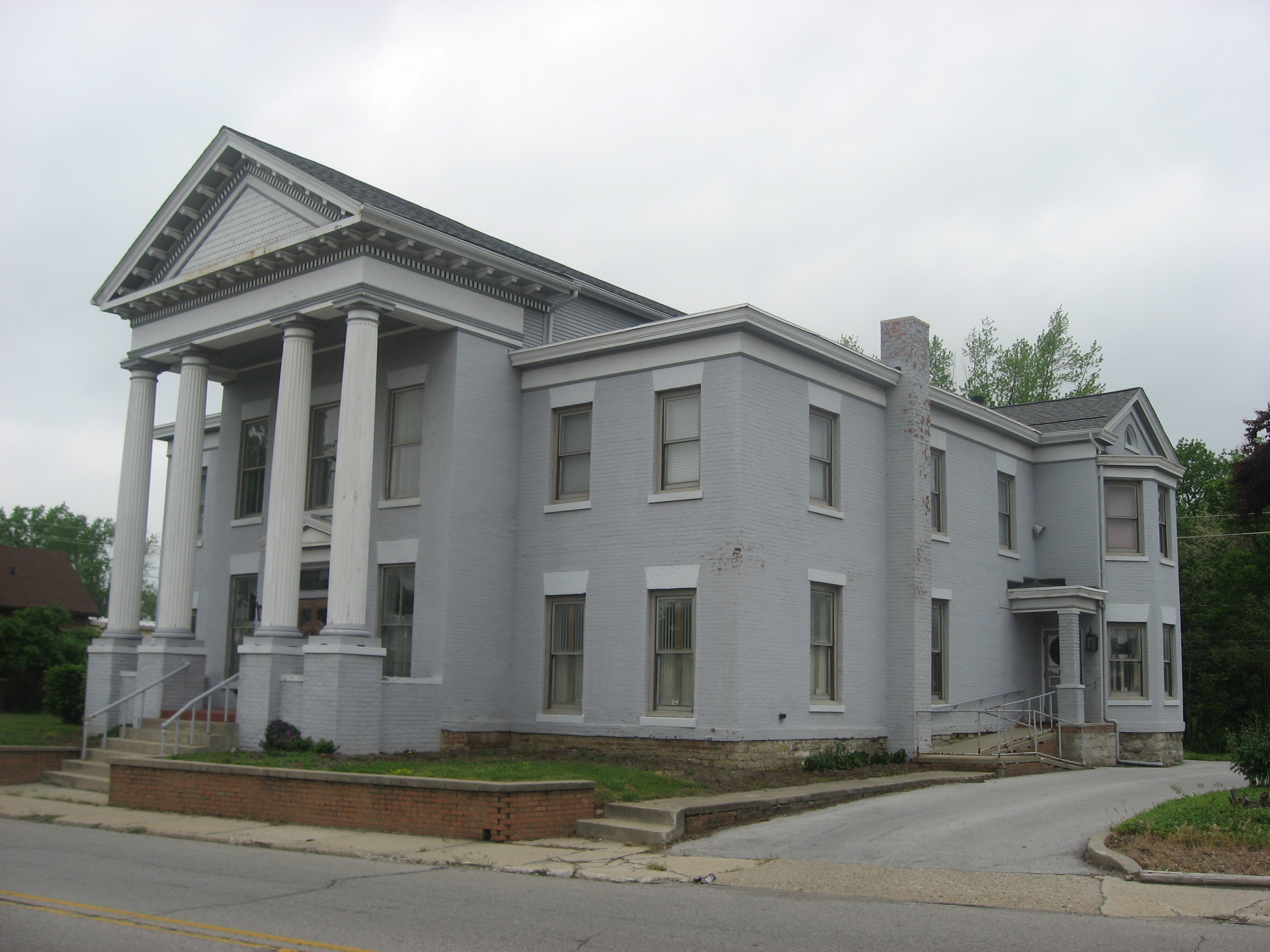
- Hugh McCulloch House, May 2012

- Location within Indiana Location within the United States
- Location: 616 W. Superior St., Fort Wayne, Indiana
- Coordinates: 41°4′51″N 85°8′50″W
- Area: less than one acre
- Built: 1843
- Architect: Williams, Henry
- Architectural style: Greek Revival, Italianate
- NRHP reference No.: 80000050
- Added to NRHP: October 23, 1980

Hugh McCulloch House is a historic home located at Fort Wayne, Indiana. It was built in 1843, and is a two-story, three bay by four bay, Greek Revival style painted brick building. It features a projecting front portico supported by four Doric order columns. An Italianate style addition was erected in 1862. It was built by U.S. statesman and United States Secretary of the Treasury Hugh McCulloch (1808–1895), and remained in the family until 1887. The house was purchased in 1892 by the Fort Wayne College of Medicine, who expanded and remodeled the house. It was sold in 1906 to the Turnverein Verewoerts, or Turners, who owned the building until 1966.

It was listed on the National Register of Historic Places in 1980.
