= William E. Sawyer =

American inventor

William Edward Sawyer (c. 1850 – May 15, 1883) was an American inventor whose contribution was primarily in the field of electric engineering and electric lighting.

His primary inventions included:

- Telegraph apparatus for cable use (March 31, 1874)
- Automatic and autographic telegraph and circuit (February 2, 1875)
- Electric engineering and lighting apparatus and system (August 14, 1877)
- Device for effecting the static discharge in autographic telegraphy (November 6, 1877)
- Electric switch (June 29, 1880)
- Electrical safety device for elevators (July 6, 1880)

A 1920 article in The New York Times described him as best known for pioneering the development of the incandescent light. In partnership with Albon Man (June 29, 1826- February 18, 1905) he founded Electro-Dynamic Light Company to produce incandescent lamps. From 1879 thorough 1885 the company successfully defended his patents against the interests of the Edison company. The patent was controlled by the Thomson-Houston Electric Company until 1888 when Westinghouse Electric bought the company producing the lamp, Consolidated Electric Light. Sawyer-Man based 'stopper' lamps, although not as long lasting as the Edison lamp, did allow Westinghouse to successfully illuminate the Chicago World's Columbian Exposition of 1893. The Sawyer-Man company was eventually purchased by the Westinghouse Corporation and became the Westinghouse lighting division.
