= Four-Phase Systems AL1 =

8-bit microprocessor

AL1
General information
- Launched: January 1971
- Designed by: Four-Phase Systems
- Common manufacturer: Cartesian

Performance
- Max. CPU clock rate: 1 MHz
- Data width: 8 bits
- Address width: 8 bits

Physical specifications
- Transistors: ~4000
- Package: 40-pin dual in-line package
- Socket: DIP40

Architecture and classification
- Application: System IV/70
- Technology node: 10 μm

Support status
- Unsupported

The AL1 was an early 8-bit microprocessor slice designed by Four-Phase Systems and unveiled in February 1970. The chip was first used as part of Four-Phase's System IV/70 24-bit minicomputer to be used with terminals shipped in January 1971. It has been widely reported as one of the first microprocessor central processing units (CPU) publicly disseminated, pre-dating the Intel 4004 by one year. In modern terms, the AL1 is a bit-slice design. The company never advertised the AL1 as an independent product and did not sell it to other customers; the 4004 was the first such design to be sold in standalone form. The AL1 was later updated as the AL4.

The AL1 served as a key example of prior art in a series of patent lawsuits initiated by Texas Instruments and Gilbert Hyatt regarding the basic technology of the microprocessor. Lee Boysel demonstrated the function of the AL1 in court to demonstrate that the design incorporated all of the patented concepts on a chip completed prior to either party's claim. (Note: Another often quoted contender for first is the MP944 inside the F-14 CADC. This began design in 1968, but working samples were not delivered until June 1970, after the AL1 was already in use and had been disclosed in April.)

== History ==
=== Fairchild work ===
Lee Boysel started work at Fairchild Semiconductor in 1966 after working at several other company's semiconductor departments. At Fairchild he worked on MOS design, which at that time was a very new concept. Over the next two years he developed several new MOS chips, including a 256-bit static RAM, an 8-bit adder, and the first integrated circuit with over 100 gates.

The adder, the Fairchild 3800, was the first device that would today be known as an 8-bit arithmetic logic unit, or ALU. It was, however, incomplete by modern standards, as it included only the arithmetic operations and lacked the logic operations like AND and bit-shifting. It did, however, include an internal accumulator, which it used to produce results without needing to store intermediate steps in external memory. Similar designs would soon appear from other companies, notably Texas Instruments' 74181 which was a complete 4-bit ALU in only 63 gates.

Through this period, Boysel was working on different ways to lay out MOS circuity using the four-phase logic concept that he was developing. This is a way to lay out the individual transistors that make up a logic gate, and the way the clock generator sends the signals through these transistors. Using this concept, the circuits can be smaller than the transistor-transistor logic (TTL) design concepts being used previously, and a larger number of gates can fit on a single chip. He began the design of a greatly expanded IC with around 1,000 gates using this process.

=== Four-Phase forms ===
Boysel left Fairchild in October 1968 to start his own company, Four-Phase Systems, which incorporated in February 1969. Corning Glass, who was at that time investing in the emerging semiconductor market, provided start-up funding of $2 million. Four-Phase was what would today be known as a fabless designer, using another Fairchild spin-off, Cartesian, as a semiconductor foundry. Smaller gates translates to cheaper ICs, which he intended to use to build lower-cost computers that would compete with systems from Data General and the mid-range machines from IBM.

The first engineering samples of the AL1 were made available in 1970. Three AL1s were combined with three custom read-only memory (ROM) chips, three random logic chips, and an external clock generator onto a board to produce the 24-bit CPU for the System IV/70, which could power up to 32 video display terminals. The company never sold the AL1 or the complete processor boards, nor did they file patents on the design, but they did publish an article in the April 1970 issue of Computer Design magazine describing it and how a single AL1 could be used to build a simple computer.

The IV/70 was successful; by the mid-1970s they had sold 350 systems. When sales of the AL1-based systems dwindled by the late 1970s, the firm introduced a series of Unix-based computers based on the Motorola 68000, which led to Motorola purchasing the company in 1982.

=== TI lawsuit ===
In 1970, Datapoint corporation (then known as CTC), sent a contract to Intel asking them for ways to reduce the complexity and heat production of the processor in their Datapoint 2200 smart terminal. Intel responded in June 1970 with a proposal to build a single-chip version of the entire processor, and mentioned the concept in an advertisement in October 1970. Texas Instruments (TI) heard of the contract and asked Datapoint if they could bid on it too. They initially pitched a three-chip design, but Datapoint pointed out that Intel was proposing a single-chip solution, and gave TI Intel's proposal. Around April 1970, TI responded by proposing a single-chip solution of their own, the TMX 1795, which was first made public in March 1971.

Datapoint ultimately chose neither design, as they solved the heat problems on their own, and both chips were much slower than their upcoming parallel TTL-based design. At that point, both companies were released from the contract. TI decided to abandon their chip, while Intel instead launched theirs commercially in April 1972 as the Intel 8008. TI did, however, begin filing patents on the design, while Intel's lawyers told them not to bother because the idea was too obvious to receive a patent. Although they took years to make it through the process, TI eventually received several of these patents, including a major one in 1980. In 1986, TI began demanding royalties from every company making microprocessors, amounting to 2 to 3% of the cost of every computer. This launched a series of lawsuits in what became known as "TI vs. Everyone".

Further confusing the issue was the 1990 award of a December 1970 patent on a "Single Chip Integrated Circuit Computer Architecture" to Gilbert Hyatt, which pre-dated TI's filings and apparently rendered their patents moot. This new wrinkle had the side-effect of causing all of the law firms involved to begin looking for additional prior art. This led to Boysel being called as an expert witness by no less than twenty-five of the law firms involved, as his article in April 1970 pre-dated all of these claims and amounted to a public demonstration. TI admitted that they were aware of the 1970 article, and it was quoted in the 1980 patent grant, but, as in the case of Hyatt, they claimed that it wasn't a "real computer".

This turned out to be a bad idea, as it made Boysel determined to prove them wrong. He built a tiny computer that mounted an AL1 on top of a plexiglass card so its 1969 manufacturing date could be clearly seen, along with the RAM, ROM, an I/O unit housed in cartridges taken from the Super Nintendo Entertainment System. The ROM held a simple program, called WSTR, that performed customer lookups. WSTR had been provided to TI and Intel by Datapoint to validate that their designs were compatible with the 2200's processor. Boysel's system ran the program perfectly, the only difference was that it did so ten times faster than the TI or Intel chips.

Boysel noted that when he described the demo just prior to the trial's scheduled start date:

Faces went white; the place turned into chaos. They just realized that they'd lost, and it was over.

The system Boysel built was designed to counter a specific part of the TI claims. Their claims used a diagram that showed a "real" computer consisting of the IC, a ROM, I/O devices, and optional RAM connected together on an 8-bit computer bus. Boysel's system was built to show that one could build a working system of that precise illustrated concept using the AL1. The demonstration was apparently convincing, and the trial was abandoned.

=== First? ===
Since the trial, others have questioned whether the demonstration means the AL1 can be described as a "true" microprocessor. In particular, Ken Shirriff, a noted retrocomputing expert, notes that the system only worked because the ROM contained the sequencing code that would normally be located on the processor itself, meaning that it could not run on its own without an external ROM.

On the other hand, Nick Tredennick, formerly the lead designer of the Motorola 68000, stated "I have looked at [the] AL1 design from the papers written about it through the circuit diagrams and discussions with Lee Boysel and I believe it to be the first microprocessor in a commercial system." Gordon Bell also supports this position.

Some confusion is to be expected; the term "microprocessor" had only been coined the year before, and the system in question was far less integrated than the AL1. By the Viatron definition, the AL1 meets all the requirements. But the term was not widely used at the time, and subject to change over the next decade. Even Four-Phase had problems deciding what to call it, at times they referred to it alternately as "the main LSI block of a low-cost fourth-generation commercial computer system," an "eight-bit computer slice", and an "arithmetic logic block".

== Design ==
Four-Phase AL1/AL4 registers
^{0}_{7}	^{0}_{6}	^{0}_{5}	^{0}_{4}	^{0}_{3}	^{0}_{2}	^{0}_{1}	^{0}_{0}	(bit position)
0 0 0 0 0 0 0 0								Zero
0 0 0 0 0 0 0 *								One
RP								Program Counter
RA								A Accumulator
RB								B Accumulator
X1								Index 1
X2								Index 2
X3								Index 3
* This bit reflects state of LSBY input

The AL1, and updated AL4, were fabricated using the then-current 10 micron process, the same used by the Intel 4004 and other designs of the era. Using the four-phase logic however, they placed over 1,000 gates (~4000 transistors) on a 130 by 120 mil (100 mm^{2}) chip. In comparative terms, the chip was as complex as the Intel 8008 but the same size as the 4004, and also ran at a much higher speed of 1 MHz, compared to 740 kHz for the 4004 or 500 kHz for the 8008.

An additional improvement was in the packaging. The 4004 is packaged in a 16-pin dual in-line package (DIP) and the 8008 in a 18-pin DIP. This is not enough pins to express data and memory addresses at the same time; therefore, accessing memory requires several cycles. The AL1 is packaged in a 40-pin DIP, so it can access memory in a single cycle. This would be a common size for later CPU designs, but this was very expensive in the era of ceramic packaging and gold wiring, it was the largest available despite their desire for two more pins. The wider busses and higher operating speed meant the AL1 is almost 10 times the speed of any other design of the era.

The AL1 is an 8-bit design with eight processor registers. The first two registers are permanently set to zero and one, the next two are the A and B accumulators, and the next three are index registers. AL1 does not have a stack pointer.

The AL1 opcode bus contains six bits. The first three select ALU operations such as load, add and subtract, OR, AND, XOR, and complement. These can be optionally combined with seven shift and rotate operations as defined by the second three bits. The results are expressed on the data bus or written to the internal register file or both.
