= Synertek =

Former American semiconductor manufacturer

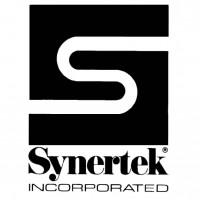
- Trade name: Synertek, Inc.
- Founded: 1973
- Defunct: 1985
- Fate: Acquired by Honeywell
- Headquarters: Santa Clara, California, United States

Synertek, Inc. was an American semiconductor manufacturer founded in 1973. The initial staff consisted of Bob Schreiner (the CEO), Dan Floyd, Jack Balletto, and Gunnar Wetlesen and Zvi Grinfas. Schreiner, Floyd, Balletto and Wetlesen were all formerly of Fairchild Semiconductor, and Synertek is thus one of the many "Fairchildren". The company became a major vendor during the late 1970s and early 1980s on the strength of its licensed production of the MOS 6502, one of the most successful microprocessors of the era. Synertek won supply deals with Apple Computer and Atari, who would produce millions of home computer and games consoles with Synertek 6502's inside.

Synertek's original production factories had been cobbled together with used equipment, and quickly ran out of capacity for ever-growing orders. The board of directors was unwilling to fund the construction of a new factory that could handle the demand. This led to a 1979 deal with Honeywell, who agreed to buy the company and operate Synertek as a hands-off division. This almost immediately led to problems when Honeywell's management failed to create a stock options program; top managers began to leave the company and they found it impossible to hire new talent without such a program. By the early 1980s, the company was hollowed out. When both Apple and Atari turned to the Motorola 68000, sales evaporated and it had no new products to offer. Honeywell closed the division in 1985.

Several of the company executives left shortly after the Honeywell purchase and formed VLSI Technology.

== History ==
=== Early years ===
The company's initial products included custom-designed devices, and line of standard products, static RAMs, ROMs, dynamic and static shift registers, built using MOS/LSI technology. Early in the company's history, Schreiner decided the company would not be able to develop a microprocessor of its own, not because of any technical limitations, but because it would not have the capability to build up the required support systems, especially software like compilers. He had noticed while working at General Electric's computer division that the software was always late and overbudget and felt the same problem would kill their small company.

Schreiner approached John Pavinen of MOS Technology, who had recently introduced the MOS 6502 series. He offered to cross-license Synertek's product line in exchange for the 6502. That would provide MOS with a second source agreement, something the market demanded at that time, while also giving them access to Synertek's existing line of designs that could be used as support chips for the 6502. Motorola was still in the process of suing MOS over trade secrets, and there was the possibility that Synertek might lose access to the design if Motorola won, but the company had no direct connection to the design and could not be sued by Motorola, so Synertek went ahead.

In the days leading up to the 1977 West Coast Computer Faire, Steve Wozniak chose to use a Synertek ROM chip for the Apple II, which was revealed at the event, after a chip from American Microsystems, Inc., didn't arrive on time. Shortly after signing the deal with MOS, Schreiner's secretary told him two people were waiting in the office to talk to him. In walked Wozniak with Steve Jobs. Jobs explained that they were putting together a company to sell computer kits, and asked for a $30,000 line of credit so they could buy Synertek's 6502s. In spite of them being dressed in jeans and sandals with "these Indian bead things around their heads", Schreiner thought the idea was a good one based on his own experience building Heathkit systems. He agreed to the terms on the condition that if they were even one day late with a payment they would be on a cash on delivery basis from that day forward. Apple Computer was never a day late, and became a multi-million dollar customer for the company.

Shortly thereafter, Jack Balletto, the company's marketing manager, convinced Schreiner to visit another up-and-coming company, Atari. Schreiner went to its offices to introduce the 6502. He was met by Al Alcorn, who said they already knew of the design. Atari had already approached Intel and National Semiconductor, but neither would give them credit. Schreiner was happy to do so. By the end of the next year, Atari was putting in orders amounting to 120% of Synertek's annual capacity. Synertek then arranged Rockwell International to take up some of Atari's order, and Rockwell would become a major supplier of the 6502 as well. Atari was the company's largest customer for several years.

The company also took out second source deals for the Philips/Signetics 2650 processor and the Zilog Z8. In 1982, Synertek became the second source for Digital Equipment Corporation's DCT11 microprocessor.

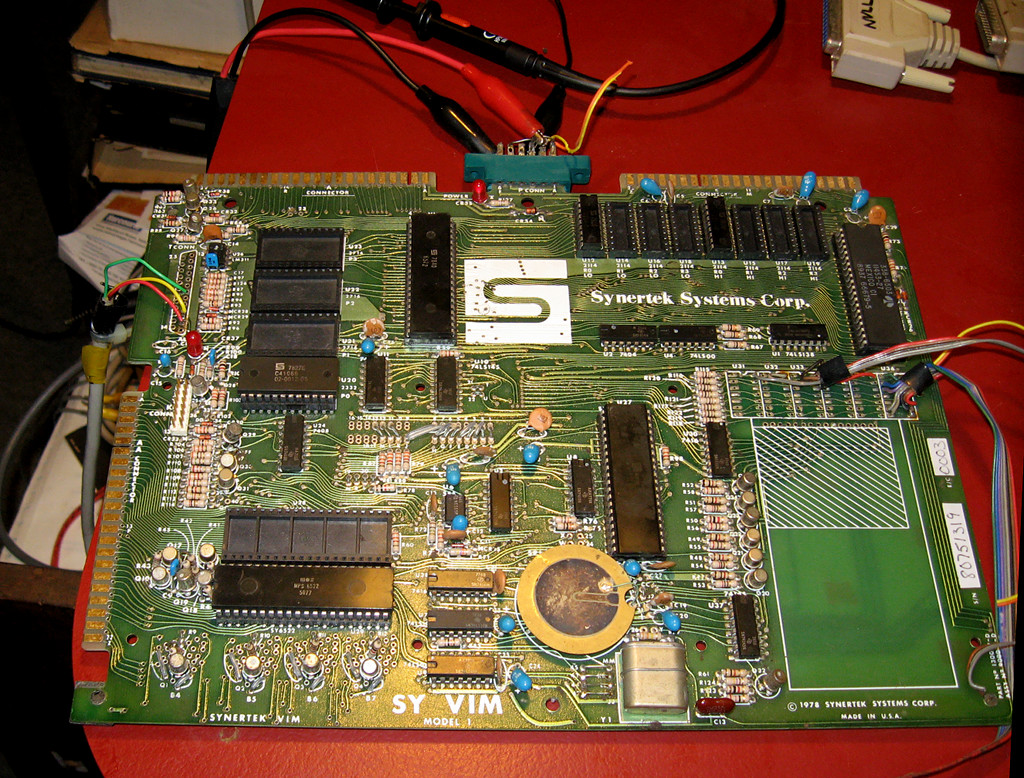
Synertek SYM-1 single board computer

Synertek acquired Microcomputer Associates, Incorporated, consisting of engineers Manny Lemas and Ray Holt, after which it was renamed Synertek Systems, Inc. and established as a subsidiary. In 1978, Synertek Systems released a 6502-based single board computer/evaluation kit called the SYM-1, a derivative of MOS Technology/Commodore Semiconductor Group's KIM-1.

=== Honeywell purchase ===
In order to remain competitive, the company needed to build a new chip making factory, or "fab". Their existing fabs in the Sunnyvale area were not particularly good - Schreiner later described them as "mickey mouse" - built as needed and often using used equipment. Intel and NatSemi had better fabs and got higher yields, allowing them to produce chips for lower cost. He approached the board of directors looking to raise about $250 million for a first-class fab, but was turned down.

He then began looking for partners who might fund the expansion. Part of his pitch was that they should build the new fab in Santa Cruz instead of Silicon Valley. In the valley, its staff would constantly be raided by other companies, and Schreiner felt that by moving even the half-hour drive away, employees who worked there would be less likely to move back without more significant incentives. Standard Oil made an offer, but Honeywell offered to buy the company outright after Schreiner told them that microprocessors were going to wipe them out if they didn't have their own production. Schreiner was sceptical it would work, as his experience at Fairchild had convinced him east-coast companies' attempts to remote control west-coast firms would not work. The CEO of Honeywell, Ed Spencer, convinced him the deal would be entirely hands-off. Schreiner then explained that there was going to have to be some sort of stock option plan or similar, or their talent would leave. Spencer promised to come up with something.

Honeywell completed the purchase in 1979. The deal soured almost immediately. To support their design efforts, Schreiner attempted to buy a PDP-11, but the order was refused. Honeywell had recently entered the mainframe business, after purchasing the former General Electric computer division. That division worried that if Synertek bought from another company it would make people question their products. After promising to build the design software needed, they sent a mainframe under a free rental agreement. The promised software never arrived. Around the same time, ranking members of the company started leaving as no option plan had emerged. When they attempted to hire new staff, no one would join for the same reason.

Floyd, Balletto, and Wetlesen left the company shortly after Honeywell's acquisition and went on to co-found chip maker VLSI Technology. Schreiner left shortly thereafter. Honeywell put in a new manager who was being fast-tracked through the company. His previous job was running a factory in Mexico that made valves for hot water heaters. The fab in Santa Cruz never became operational because the people who would be able to start it up refused to move out of the valley as they believed the company would disappear and they would be stranded. The fab was eventually purchased by Western Digital, a Los Angeles area company who had no ties to the valley.

During this time, Steve Jobs approached Synertek looking for a new 16-bit version of the 6502 processor for upcoming projects. Schreiner declined, feeling the company could not afford to develop it, but offered to do so if Apple would fund the project. Jobs declined, and noted that this would force Apple to move to the Motorola 68000. When this finally came to pass, and Atari followed them the next year, Synertek's sales imploded. By this time the custom side of the company was long gone, the Honeywell mainframe still lacked design software, and they had no other modern processor design license. The only design added through this era was the low-end Zilog Z8 microcontroller, which Honeywell needed for a new line of programmable thermostats, replacing the original clockwork Chronotherm of the 1940s.

By 1985 the company was a shell, with all the talent having left the company, no new designs, and no design capability. Honeywell shut down operations at Synertek that year.

== Facilities ==
Synertek's semiconductor fabrication plant in Santa Clara, California operated from 1974 to 1985. The site, at 3050 Coronado Drive, was later found to be contaminated with organic solvents (including trichloroethane, trichloroethylene, and vinyl chloride) and required Superfund cleanup to ameliorate hazardous releases into the aquifer.

In around 1983, construction began for an additional manufacturing facility in Santa Cruz, California. When market conditions deteriorated, primarily because of business downturns at Atari, work was stopped at the Santa Cruz facility and it was sold.
