= Four-Phase Systems =

American computer company, 1969 to 1982

Four-Phase Systems, Inc.
- Industry: Semiconductor
- Founded: 1969; 57 years ago
- Founder: Lee Boysel
- Defunct: 1982
- Fate: Acquired by Motorola
- Headquarters: Cupertino, California, U.S.
- Products: Semiconductor main memory, LSI MOS logic, central processing unit, microprocessor

Four-Phase Systems, Inc. was a computer company, founded by Lee Boysel and others, which built one of the earliest computers using semiconductor main memory and MOS LSI logic. The company was incorporated in February 1969 and had moderate commercial success. It was acquired by Motorola in 1982.

== History ==
The idea behind Four-Phase Systems began when Boysel was designing MOS components at Fairchild Semiconductor in 1967. Boysel wrote a manifesto explaining how a computer could be built from a small number of MOS chips. Fairchild made Boysel head of a MOS design group, which he used to design parts satisfying the requirements of his putative computer. After doing this, Boysel left to start Four-Phase in October 1968, initially with two other engineers from his Fairchild group as well as others. Boysel was not sued by Fairchild, perhaps because of chaos caused by a change in Fairchild management at that time. When the company was incorporated in February 1969, he was joined by other engineers from the Fairchild group. Robert Noyce, co-founder of Intel, was an early board member.

Boysel arranged for chips to be fabricated by Cartesian, a wafer-processing company founded by another engineer from Fairchild. By spring of 1970, Four-Phase had an engineering-level system operating. Four-Phase showed its system at the Fall Joint Computer Conference in 1970. By June 1971, Four-Phase IV/70 computers were in use at four different customers, and by March 1973, they had shipped 347 systems to 131 customers. The company enjoyed a substantial level of success, having revenues of $178 million and 2,800 employees by 1979. As of 1979, their models included:

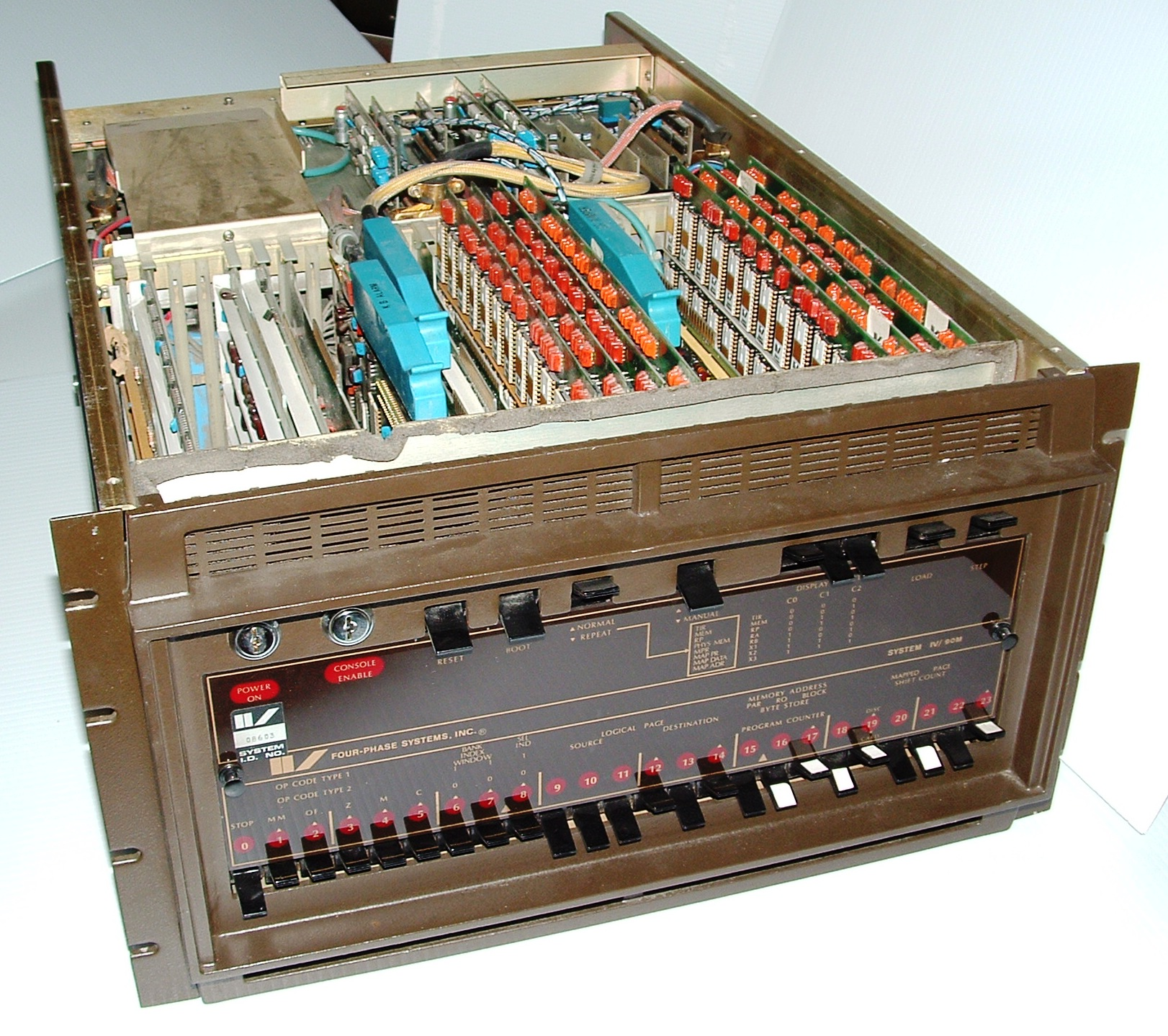
A Four-Phase IV/90 computer

Model	Date announced	Date of first delivery
System IV/30	December 1976	December 1976
System IV/40	March 1973	July 1973
System IV/50	June 1976	4th quarter 1976
System IV/55	December 1976	December 1976
System IV/60	April 1979	June 1979
System IV/65	April 1979	June 1979
System IV/70	September 1970	February 1972
System IV/90	June 1977	July 1977

The IV/30 and IV/55 were intended for only one or two data entry/display stations, while the IV/40 and higher were intended for multiple high-volume data entry stations and independent data processing, and the IV/60 and higher could be made into small computer systems. In Europe, the IV/70 was sold as the Philips X1140-60 and the IV/90 was sold as the Philips P7000 series.

In 1982, Four-Phase was sold to Motorola for a $253 million stock exchange (equivalent to $844 million today). The former location of the business on N De Anza Blvd is now Apple's Infinite Loop campus.

== System ==
The Four-Phase CPU used a 24-bit word size. It fit on a single card and was composed of three AL1 chips, three read-only memory (ROM) chips, and three random logic chips. A memory card used Four-Phase's 1K random-access memory (RAM) chips. The system also included a built-in video controller which could drive up to 32 terminals from a character buffer.

=== AL1 chip ===
The AL1 is an 8-bit bit slice which contains eight registers and an arithmetic logic unit (ALU). It was implemented using four-phase logic and used over a thousand gates, with an area of 130 by 120 mils (3.3 by 3.0 mm). The chip was described in an April 1970 article in Computer Design magazine. Although the AL1 was not called a microprocessor, or used as one at the time, it was later dubbed one in connection with litigation in the 1990s, when Texas Instruments claimed to have patented the microprocessor. In response, Boysel assembled a system in which a single 8-bit AL1 was used as part of a courtroom demonstration computer system, together with ROM, RAM and an input–output device, where the ROM and its associated latch acted like a microcode controller to provide control lines for memory read/write, selecting an ALU operation, and providing the address of the next microcode instruction. The AL1 and its chipset is arguably the first microprocessor used in a commercial product (vs the Intel 4004, the first commercially available microprocessor).
