= DEC T-11 =

Microprocessor developed by Digital Equipment Corporation

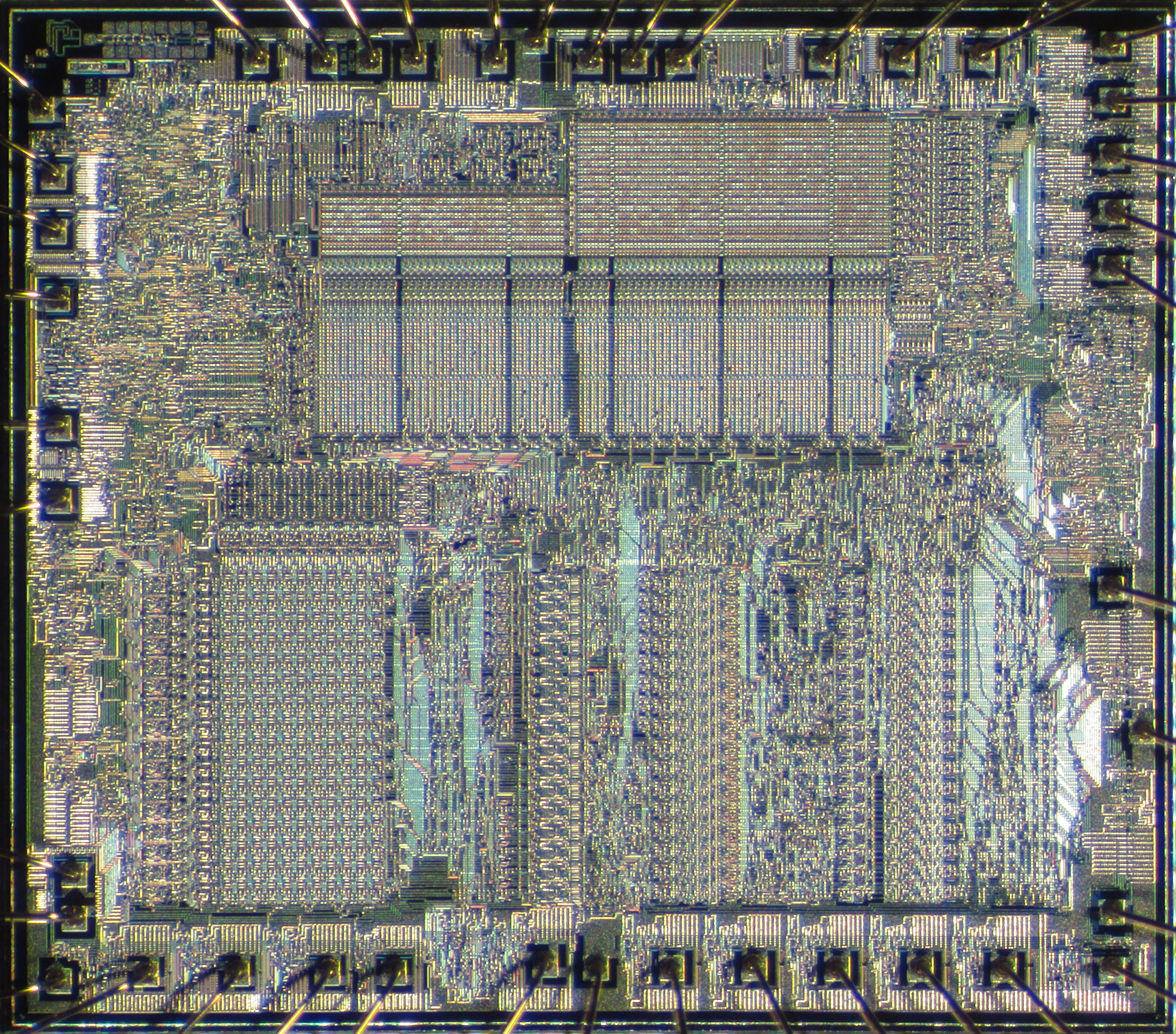
Die shot of DEC T-11

The T-11, also known as DC310 or DCT11, is a microprocessor that implements the PDP-11 instruction set architecture (ISA) developed by Digital Equipment Corporation. The T-11 was code-named "Tiny". It was developed for embedded systems and was the first single-chip microprocessor developed by DEC. Going into volume production in early 1982, it was sold openly and was used by DEC in disk controllers (Eg: M8639 RQDX2 controller), the VT240 terminal, auxiliary processors and in the Atari System 2 arcade game system. It operated at 7.5 MHz or 10 MHz (three versions, two speeds), used a 5 V power supply and dissipated 1.1 W maximum. It contained 13,000 transistors, used NMOS logic, and was fabricated in a NMOS process. By 1987, three versions of the DCT11 were available: 21-17311-01 (original 7.5 MHz version, produced by DEC), 21-17311-00 (second source, 7.5 MHz, from Synertek), and 21-17311-02 (10 MHz version, produced by DEC).

A clone of the T-11 was manufactured in the Soviet Union under the designation KR1807VM1 (Russian: КР1807ВМ1).
