= Raymond Holt =

Raymond Holt or Ray Holt is the name of:

- Raymond Holt (character) from Brooklyn Nine Nine
- Ray Holt (computer scientist), American computer scientist
- Ray Holt (footballer), English footballer
