= Computers Unlimited =

American time-sharing company

Computers Unlimited, inc. (CUI) was a timesharing company headquartered in Rochester, New York. The company was founded before 1968 to offer consulting services and CP/CMS timesharing on an IBM 360/67 computer. The first president was Virgil M. Ross.

The company went public in 1969 with a market capitalization if $1.75 million (equivalent to $15,000,000 in 2024). That year they had "major software development contracts" with Xerox Corporation, and a timesharing contract with the University of Rochester, and were also resellers for the Viatron System 21 display terminals, and the Miracl/CPG COBOL programming system.

Computers Unlimited declared bankruptcy in late 1970.
