= Ray Holt (computer scientist) =

American computer scientist

- Born: 1944 (age 81–82); Compton, California
- Education: California State Polytechnic University, Pomona
- Known for: MP944
- Scientific career
- Fields: Electrical engineering; Microprocessor
- Workplaces: Garrett AiResearch; Microcomputer Associates

Raymond M. Holt (born in 1944) is an American computer designer and businessman in Silicon Valley.

Ray Holt graduated from California State Polytechnic University, Pomona.

From 1968 to 1970, Ray and his brother Bill Holt were on the Garrett AiResearch's small design team that developed what he claims is the world's first microprocessor chip set, the 20-bit Central Air Data Computer (CADC), for the F-14 Tomcat (although the Viatron 2101 multi-chip processor had already been available at the time of the CADC's release). The CADC was never deployed for any other purpose, thereby leaving room for the 4-bit Intel 4004 to become the first commercially produced microprocessor. Holt's story of the design and development of the CADC is presented in a podcast and a Wired article.

Holt was co-founder with Manny Lemas of Microcomputer Associates, Incorporated, later known as Synertek Systems where he designed the Jolt, Super Jolt and SYM-1 microcomputer cards as well as the first microcomputer pinball game, Lucky Dice, using the Intel 4004. One of Holt's computer boards, the SYM-1, was used in the first two military robots, Robart I and Robart II.

Holt is the founder and as of 2014 president of Mississippi Robotics, a non-profit organization serving rural schools and ministries in Mississippi, teaching a STEM/Robotics curriculum and holding robot competitions twice a year.
