= Four-phase logic =

Four-phase logic is a type of, and design methodology for dynamic logic. It enabled non-specialist engineers to design quite complex ICs, using either PMOS or NMOS processes. It uses a kind of 4-phase clock signal to smooth out power delivery and improve switching time for MOS transistors.

== History ==
R. K. "Bob" Booher, an engineer at Autonetics, invented four-phase logic and communicated the idea to Frank Wanlass at Fairchild Semiconductor; Wanlass promoted this logic form at General Instrument Microelectronics Division. Booher made the first working four-phase chip, the Autonetics DDA integrator, during February 1966; he later designed several chips for and built the Autonetics D200 airborne computer using this technique.

In April 1967, Joel Karp and Elizabeth de Atley published an article "Use four-phase MOS IC logic" in Electronic Design magazine. In the same year, Cohen, Rubenstein, and Wanlass published "MTOS four phase clock systems". Wanlass had been director of research and engineering at General Instrument Microelectronics Division in New York since leaving Fairchild Semiconductor in 1964.

Lee Boysel, a disciple of Wanlass and a designer at Fairchild Semiconductor, and later founder of Four-Phase Systems, gave a "late news" talk on a four-phase 8-bit adder device in October 1967 at the International Electron Devices meeting. J. L. Seely, manager of MOS Operations at General Instrument Microelectronics Division, also wrote about four-phase logic in late 1967.

In 1968 Boysel published an article "Adder on a Chip: LSI Helps Reduce Cost of Small Machine" in Electronics magazine; Four-phase papers from Y. T. Yen also appeared that year. Other papers followed shortly.

Boysel recalls that four-phase dynamic logic used in the AL1 allowed him to achieve 10× the packing density, 10× the speed, and 1/10 the power compared to other MOS techniques being used at the time (metal-gate saturated-load PMOS logic), using the first-generation MOS process at Fairchild.

== Structure ==
There are two types of logic gates – a "1" gate and a "3" gate. These differ only in the clock phases used to drive them. A gate can have any logic function; thus, potentially, every gate has a customized layout. An example 2-input NAND 1 gate and an inverter 3 gate, together with their clock phases (the example uses NMOS transistors), are shown below:

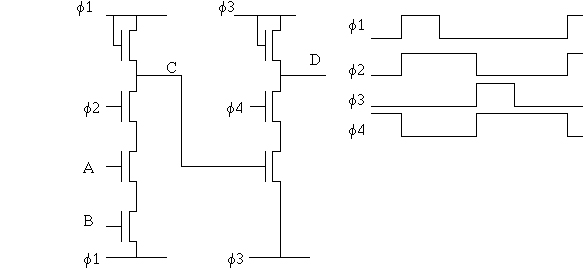

The Φ1 and Φ3 clocks need to be non-overlapping, as do the Φ2 and Φ4 clocks. Considering the 1 gate, during the Φ1 clock high time (also known as the precharge time), the output C precharges up to V(Φ1) − V_{th}, where V_{th} represents the threshold of the precharge transistor. During the next quarter clock cycle (the sample time), when Φ1 is low, and Φ2 is high, C either stays high (if A or B are low) or gets discharged low (if A and B are high).

The A and B inputs must be stable throughout this sample time. The output C becomes valid during this time, and therefore, a 1 gate output cannot drive another 1 gate's inputs. Hence 1 gates have to feed 3 gates, and they, in turn, have to feed 1 gates.

One more thing is useful – 2 and 4 gates. A 2 gate precharges on Φ1 and samples on Φ3:

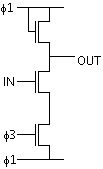

and a 4 gate precharges on Φ3 and samples on Φ1.

Gate interconnection rules are: 1 gates can drive 2 gates and/or 3 gates; 2 gates can drive only 3 gates; 3 gates can drive 4 gates and/or 1 gates; 4 gates can drive only 1 gates:

== Usage ==
Four-phase logic works well; in particular, there are no race hazards because every combinational logic gate includes a register. It is worth noting that the layout does not require the bussing of any power supplies – only clock lines are bussed. Also, since the design technique is ratioless (unlike static logic), many designs can use minimum-size transistors.

There are some difficulties:

- The gate output is dynamic. This means that its state is held on capacitance at the gate output. But the output track can cross clock lines and other gate outputs, all of which can change the charge on the capacitor. So that the gate output voltage remains at some safe 0 or 1 level during the cycle, the amount of change has to be calculated, and, if necessary, additional (diffusion) capacitance has to be added to the output node.
- For a given supply voltage, process, and clock frequency, the designer has to do some calculations so that the layout engineers can, in turn, do their calculations to work out the "bulk-up" capacitance needed for each gate. A gate with a lot of capacitance load could need bigger than minimum input transistors (so that the load could be discharged in time). This, in turn, increases the load on the gates driving that gate's inputs. So it can happen, especially in high-frequency designs, that the gate sizing keeps increasing if the speed target is too aggressive.

The first electronic calculator to be built with large-scale integrated circuits (LSI), the Sharp QT-8D from 1969, used 4-phase logic, which was fabricated by Rockwell International because Japan did not yet have the LSI technology to do it domestically. 4-phase logic was also considered for use in the Intel 4004, but only Rockwell had the design tools and expertise to do large scale 4-phase ICs at that time, so Intel settled on 2-phase dynamic logic instead.

== Evolution ==
With the advent of CMOS, the precharge transistor could be changed to be the complement of the logic transistor type, which allows the gate's output to charge quickly up to the high level of the clock line, thus improving the speed, signal swing, power consumption, and noise margin. This technique is used in domino logic.
