= Microcomputer Associates =

Former American computer company

Microcomputer Associates, Inc., was an American computer company founded by Manny Lemas and Ray Holt. It produced the low-cost Jolt Microcomputer, designed by Holt and released in 1975 for US$249 (equivalent to $1,460 in 2024). A Jolt microcomputer was notably used in the Atari VCS prototype by Cyan Engineering.

MAI was later acquired by semiconductor manufacturer Synertek, a second source manufacturer of the 6502, and renamed Synertek Systems. It then created the SYM-1, a 6502-based single board microcomputer and spiritual successor to the KIM-1. In 1978 the company offered a number of processor and peripheral modules.
