= SYM-1 =

Microprocessor development board

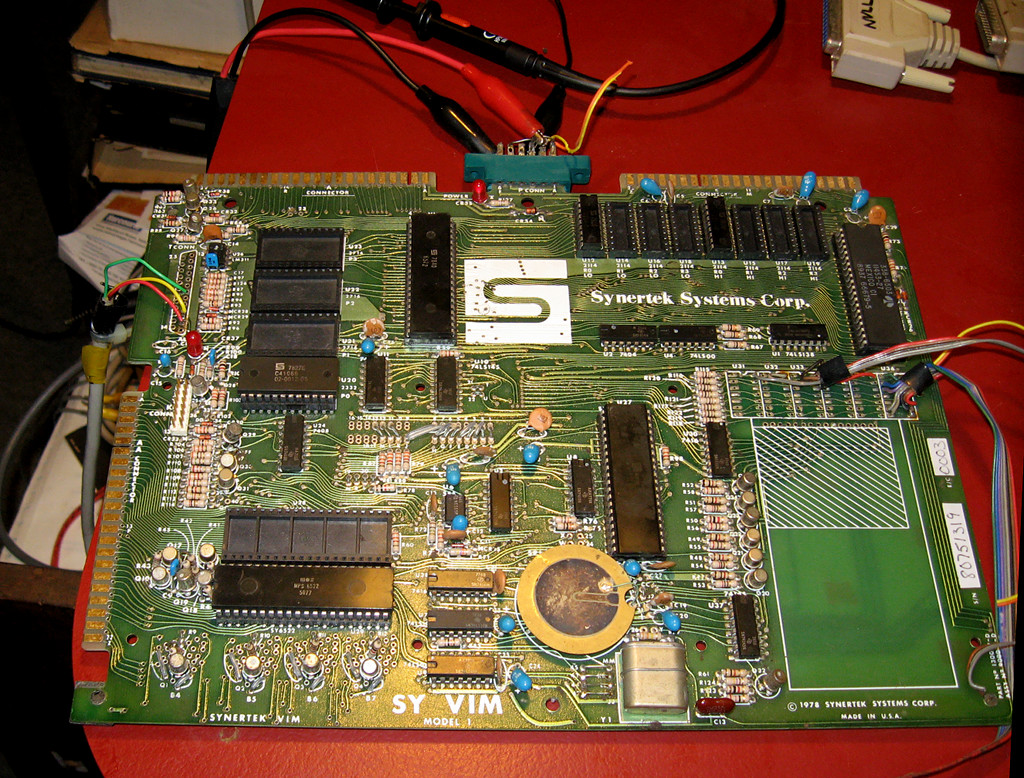
- Synertek VIM-1 (1978, later SYM-1)
- Also known as: VIM-1
- Developer: Ray Holt
- Manufacturer: Synertek Systems
- Type: single board "trainer" computer
- Released: circa 1976; 50 years ago
- Introductory price: US$238 (equivalent to $1,420 in 2025)
- Units sold: 50,000
- Operating system: Supermon monitor
- CPU: Synertek 6502 @ 1 MHz
- Memory: 1 KB RAM (expandable to 4 KB on board), 4 KB ROM
- Storage: Tape recorder
- Display: 6 digit LED display
- Sound: Built-in loudspeaker
- Input: 29 'sensitive' keys, Serial RS-232, 51 I/O lines connector
- Power: External 5V - 1.5A power supply unit
- Dimensions: 10.75 inch x 8.25 inch x 0.5 inch

The SYM-1 is a single board "trainer" computer produced by Synertek Systems in 1975. It was designed by Ray Holt. Originally called the VIM-1 (Versatile Input Monitor), that name was later changed to SYM-1.

The SYM-1 is a close copy of the popular MOS Technology KIM-1 system, with which it is compatible to a large extent. Compared to the KIM-1, enhancements include the ability to run on a single +5 volt power supply, an enhanced monitor ROM, three configurable ROM/EPROM sockets, RAM expandable on board to 4 KB, an RS-232 serial port, and a "high speed" (185 bytes/second, the KIM-1 supports about 8 bytes/second) audio cassette storage interface. It also features on-board buffer circuits to ease interfacing to "high voltage or high current" devices.

One capability of the SYM-1 is its ability to allow an oscilloscope to be added to provide a 32 character display under software control. As explained in Chapter 7 of the "SYM Reference Manual", the vertical input, ground and trigger input of the oscilloscope are to be connected to the "Scope Out" connector AA on the SYM-1 board. The "Oscilloscope Output Driver Software" code provided in this chapter of the manual is to be entered into the SYM-1's memory and executed to enable the oscilloscope display. This code provides control of the oscilloscope display, as well as a rudimentary character set. Resistors R42 and R45 are to be adjusted to refine the displayed image.

Synertek sold ROMs which could be installed to add the BASIC programming language or a Resident Assembler/Editor (RAE). Synertek contracted with a company called Eastern House Software to port their Macro Assembler/Editor (MAE) into an 8 KB ROM. The author of MAE, RAE, and another version sold by Skyles Electric Works was Carl Moser. MAE was sold in various forms not only for the SYM-1 but also for other 6502-based computers including Commodore, Atari, KIM, and Apple. Other forms of MAE included a cross assembler for 6800 and 8085—and an offering of these cross assemblers was planned for RAE.

One of the more subtle features of the SYM-1 is the use of a look up table in the low memory of the 6502. This provides a vectoring function in its operating system to redirect subroutine calls to various input and output drivers, including interrupt servicing. Users are able to develop their own interface routines, and substitute new vectors for the original vectors in the startup UV-EPROM. This seamlessly maintains the normal operation of the board's monitor and languages such as Synertek Systems BASIC. One of the later home/education computers that uses this concept extensively is the BBC Micro produced by Acorn Computers in the UK. Some of the other computer designers of this era failed to grasp the significance of this elegant use of vectors to the software mapping of new developments in hardware.

== See also ==
- Microprocessor development board
- Elektor Junior Computer
- AIM-65
