= Lee Boysel =

American electrical engineer and entrepreneur

- Born: December 31, 1938
- Died: April 25, 2021 (aged 82)
- Education: University of Michigan
- Occupations: Entrepreneur; Business executive Electrical engineer Investor
- Known for: Founder of Four-Phase Systems
- Awards: University of Michigan Electrical & Computer Engineering Merit Award (2007)

Lee Loren Boysel (December 31, 1938 – April 25, 2021) was an American electrical engineer and entrepreneur. While at Fairchild Semiconductor, he developed four-phase logic and built the first integrated circuit with over 100 logic gates, and designed the Fairchild 3800 / 3804 8-bit ALUs. Boysel designed the Four-Phase Systems AL1. He founded Four-Phase Systems to commercialize the technology, and sold the company to Motorola in 1981.

He was a graduate of the University of Michigan with a BS and MS in Electrical Engineering.

== Litigation ==
Texas Instruments claimed to have patented the microprocessor and, in response, Boysel assembled a system in which a single 8-bit AL1 was used as part of a courtroom demonstration computer system, together with ROM, RAM and an input-output device.
