= Viatron =

American computer company

Viatron Computer Systems Corporation
- Industry: Computer
- Founded: 1967; 59 years ago in Bedford, Massachusetts
- Founder: Edward M. Bennett; Dr. Joseph Spiegel
- Defunct: 1971
- Fate: Bankruptcy liquidation

Viatron Computer Systems Corporation, or simply Viatron was an American computer company headquartered in Bedford, Massachusetts, and later Burlington, Massachusetts. Viatron coined the term "microprocessor" although it was not used in the sense in which the word microprocessor is used today.

Viatron was founded in 1967 by engineers from Mitre Corporation led by Dr. Edward M. Bennett and Dr. Joseph Spiegel. In 1968 the company announced its System 21 small computer system together with its intention to lease the systems starting at a revolutionary price of $40 per month. The basic system included a microprocessor with 512 characters of read/write RAM memory, a keyboard, a 9-inch (23 cm) CRT display and two cartridge tape drives.

The system specifications, advanced for 1968 – five years before the advent of the first commercial personal computers – caused a lot of excitement in the computer industry. The System 21 was aimed, among others, at applications such as mathematical and statistical analysis, business data processing, data entry and media conversion, and educational/classroom use.

The expectation was that the use of new large scale integrated circuit technology (LSI) and volume would enable Viatron to be successful at lower margins, however the prototype did not incorporate LSI technology. In 1968 Bennett claimed that by 1972 Viatron would have delivered more "digital machines" than had "previously been installed by all computer makers." He declared "We want to turn out computers like GM turns out Chevvies,"

The semiconductor industry was unable to produce circuits in the volumes required, forcing Viatron to sell fewer than the planned 5,000–6,000 systems per month. This raised the production costs per unit and prevented the company from ever achieving profitability.

Bennet and Spiegel were fired in 1970, and the company declared Chapter XI bankruptcy in 1971.

== System 21 components ==
As announced the System 21 line consisted of the following:

- System 21 Terminal. What would later be called an intelligent terminal, the System 21 terminal included either the 2101 or 2111 microprocessors, a 9 inches (23 cm) CRT display formatted as four lines of 20 characters with optional color, a keyboard, a control panel, and attachability of up to two peripherals:
  - The terminal was equipped with one of two microprocessors.
    - 2101 – 512 16-bit words of read-only memory (ROM), 400 8-bit character read/write magnetic-core memory.
    - 2111 – 1024 16-bit words of read-only memory (ROM), 400 8-bit character read/write magnetic-core memory.
  - Printing robot – fit over the keyboard of a standard IBM Selectric typewriter and generated typed output at 12 characters per second.
  - Card Reader-punch – despite its name this was actually an attachment for an IBM 129 keypunch to provide punched card input and output.
  - Communications adapter – provided serial ASCII communications at 1200 bits per second.
  - Tape channel attachments – provided for attachment of up to two "Viatape" cartridge recorders, capable of reading and writing 80 character records at 1200 bits per second. So-called Computer Compatible tape recorders, Magnetic tape units, could also be attached to the tape channel attachments to read and write 6 inches (15 cm) mini-reels at either 9 track, 800 bpi or 7 track, 556/800 bpi.
  - Foreign device attachment – provided parallel input/output in ASCII or Hollerith punch-card code.
- System 21 computers. Two computers were announced with the System 21: the 2140 and the 2150. Both employed a MOS LSI CPU and magnetic core memory. The systems included 2 μs core memory with 16-bit words and a high speed data channel. Computers weighed about 62 pounds (28 kg).
  - The 2140 included 4 KW of memory and could support up to 8 local or remote System 21 terminals.
  - The 2150 included 8 KW of memory and could support up to 24 local or remote System 21 terminals.
  - Software. The Viatron Programming System (VPS) came standard with:
    - DDL-I (Distributed Data Language I)
    - Assembler
    - Subroutine library containing input/output, mathematical, arithmetic and conversion routines
    - Utility program library containing load, dump, and a library manager
    - A FORTRAN IV compiler standard with the 2150.

== CPU ==
The Viatron CPUs differed in memory size and interrupt levels – 2 on the 2140 and 4 on the 2150. They had the ability to operate on 8-bit, 16-bit, 32-bit, or 48-bit data. Three index registers were provided.

The CPUs included two independent arithmetic units with different capabilities.

- Arithmetic unit I had three 16-bit registers called A, B, and C, and a 16-bit D register which functioned as a buffer.
- Arithmetic unit II performed both arithmetic and addressing operations. It had four registers. P was the program counter, R and E were special-purpose, and Q, which was used for 32-bit operations (with A as the high-order word), or 48-bit operations (with A and B). Q also served as the multiplier-quotient register for multiplication and division.

The system had two instruction formats: Standard, 16-bit instructions, and Extended, 32-bit instructions. Standard instructions had a 6-bit operation code, a two-bit index register identifier, and an 8-bit PC-relative address. Extended instructions had a 6-bit operation code, a two-bit index register identifier, an 8-bit operation code modifier, and a 16-bit memory address. Indirect addressing was allowed.

There were 85 instructions, some of which had both standard and extended forms:

- Arithmetic – add, subtract, multiply and divide
- Logical – and, or, exclusive or
- Load and Store
- Shift and Rotate
- Modify memory word and skip on test
- Execute input/output
- Branching – skip or branch on condition, branch unconditional, branch and store program counter (conditional and unconditional), add to index register and skip on test
- Operate – increment/decrement register, ones complement register, negate (twos-complement) register, move register to register, move console switches to register, increment register and skip on test. All the above operate instructions used one or more of registers A, B, or C. There were also wait and a no-operation operate instructions.

== Typeface ==
Viatron commissioned Harry N. Peble to design the Viafont-X, a patented typeface (1971) readable by both humans and machines, for use in conjunction with the company's optical character recognition devices.

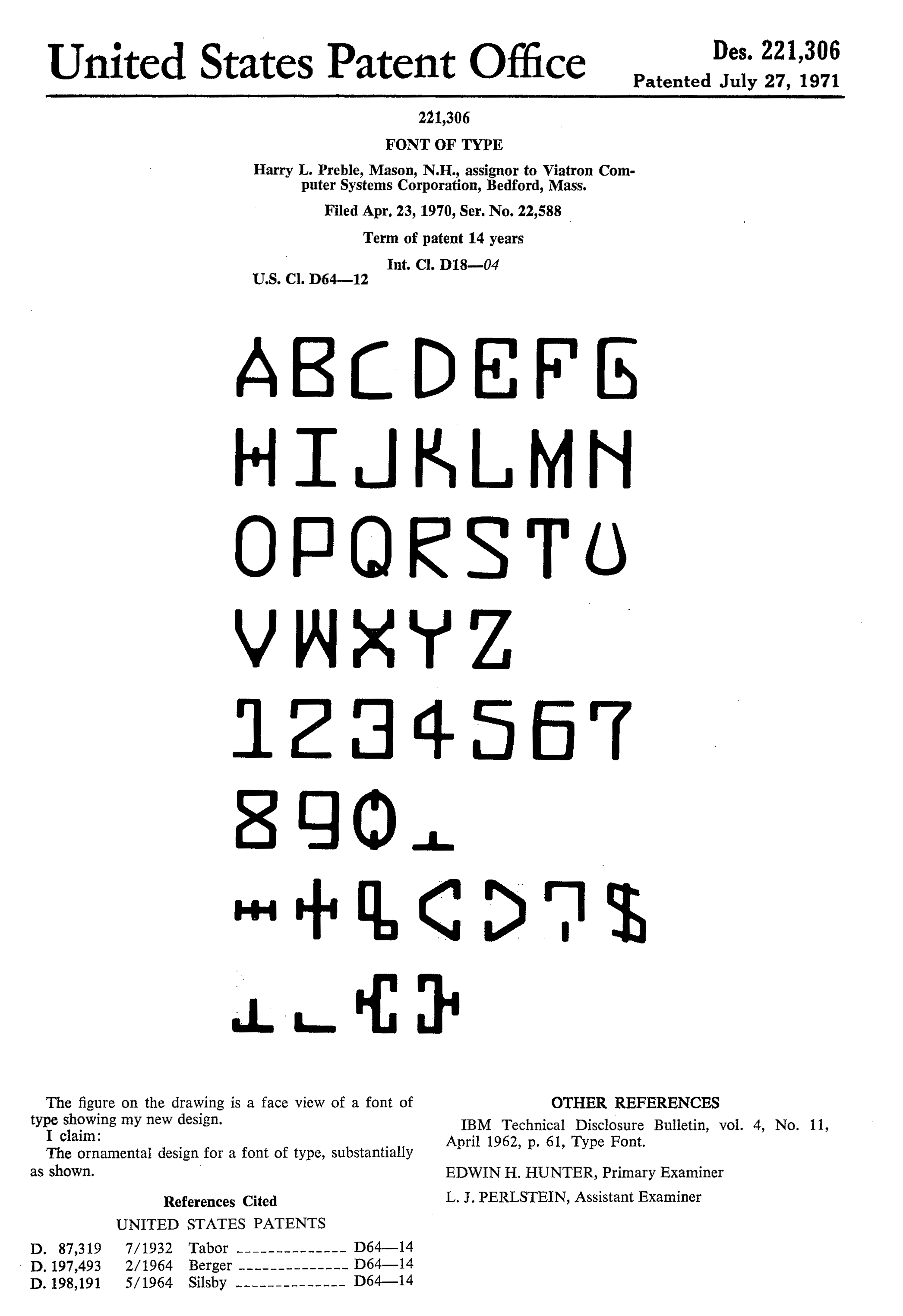
U.S. Patent for the Viafont-X typeface.
