= Daniel Meyer (engineer) =

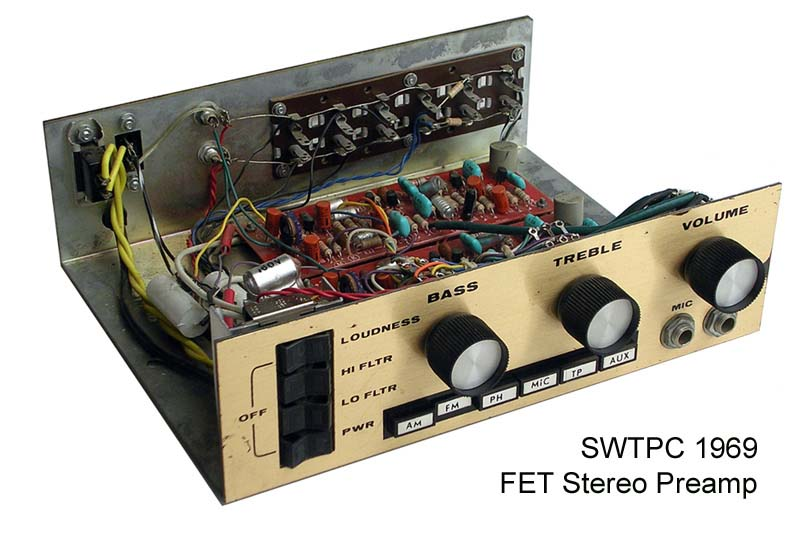
Stereo preamplifier designed by Daniel Meyer and published in Popular Electronics, May 1969.

Daniel Meyer (February 6, 1932 – May 16, 1998) was the founder and president Southwest Technical Products Corporation. He was born in New Braunfels, Texas, and raised in San Marcos, Texas, where he earned a bachelor's degree in mathematics and physics in 1957 from Southwest Texas State. After college he married Helen Wentz, moved to San Antonio and became a research engineer in the electrical engineering department of Southwest Research Institute.

He soon started writing hobbyist articles. The first was in Electronics World (May 1960) and later he had a two part cover feature for Radio-Electronics (October, November 1962). The March 1963 issue of Popular Electronics featured his ultrasonic listening device on the cover. The projects would often require a printed circuit board or specialized components that were not available at the local electronics parts store. Readers could purchase them directly from Dan Meyer.

Dan Meyer saw the business opportunity in providing circuit boards and parts for the Popular Electronics projects. In January 1964 he left Southwest Research Institute to start an electronics kit company. He continued to write articles and ran the mail order kit business from his home garage in San Antonio, Texas. By 1965 he was providing the kits for other authors such as Lou Garner. In 1967 he sold a kit for Don Lancaster's "IC-67 Metal Locator". In early 1967 Meyer moved his growing business from his home to a new building on a 3-acre (12,000 m^{2}) site in San Antonio. The Daniel E. Meyer Company (DEMCO) became Southwest Technical Products Corporation (SWTPC) that fall.

The concept of selling a kit based on a magazine article had been around since the early days of radio. Daniel Meyer perfected the process. In 1967, Popular Electronics had six articles by Dan Meyer and four by Don Lancaster. Seven of that year's cover stories featured kits sold by SWTPC. In the years 1966 to 1971, SWTPC's authors wrote 64 articles and had 25 cover stories in Popular Electronics. (Don Lancaster alone had 23 articles and 10 were cover stories.) The San Antonio Express-News did a feature story on Southwest Technical Products in November 1972. "Meyer built his mail-order business from scratch to more than $1 million in sales in six years." The company was shipping 100 kits a day from 18,000 square feet (1,700 m^{2}) of buildings.

In the first ten years, SWTPC's most popular products were audio kits followed by test equipment. There was also typical 1970s products like color organs that would synchronize colored lights with music as well as strobe lights. Dan Meyer developed a series of very low intermodulation (IM) distortion audio power amplifiers known as Tigers, many still in use today. Don Lancaster developed a series of decimal readout counters and voltmeters that used the latest technology.

In mid 1975 Dan Meyer asked one of his engineers, Gary Kay, to design a computer based on the Motorola 6800 design kit. The first deliveries were in November 1975. In June 1976 SWTPC introduced the AC-30 Cassette Interface for data storage and the PR-40 printer. One could now purchase a complete computer system for about $1500.

Many of the early hobbyist computer companies were founded by engineers who did not know how to run a business. They would fold in a year or so. SWTPC had been successful in the kit business for over a decade so they could deliver working products. Floppy Disk systems, full feature terminals, and many peripherals were added in 1977. The bus structure was called the SS-50 and soon many other vendors were making add-in cards and complete systems. In 1979 SWTPC introduced a new line based on the Motorola 6809 processor. These systems were produced until the mid-1980s. By then, the IBM PC was dominating the personal computer world and SWTPC shifted to point of sale (POS) systems.
