= SWTPC =

Defunct US electronic kit and computer producer

Southwest Technical Products Corporation

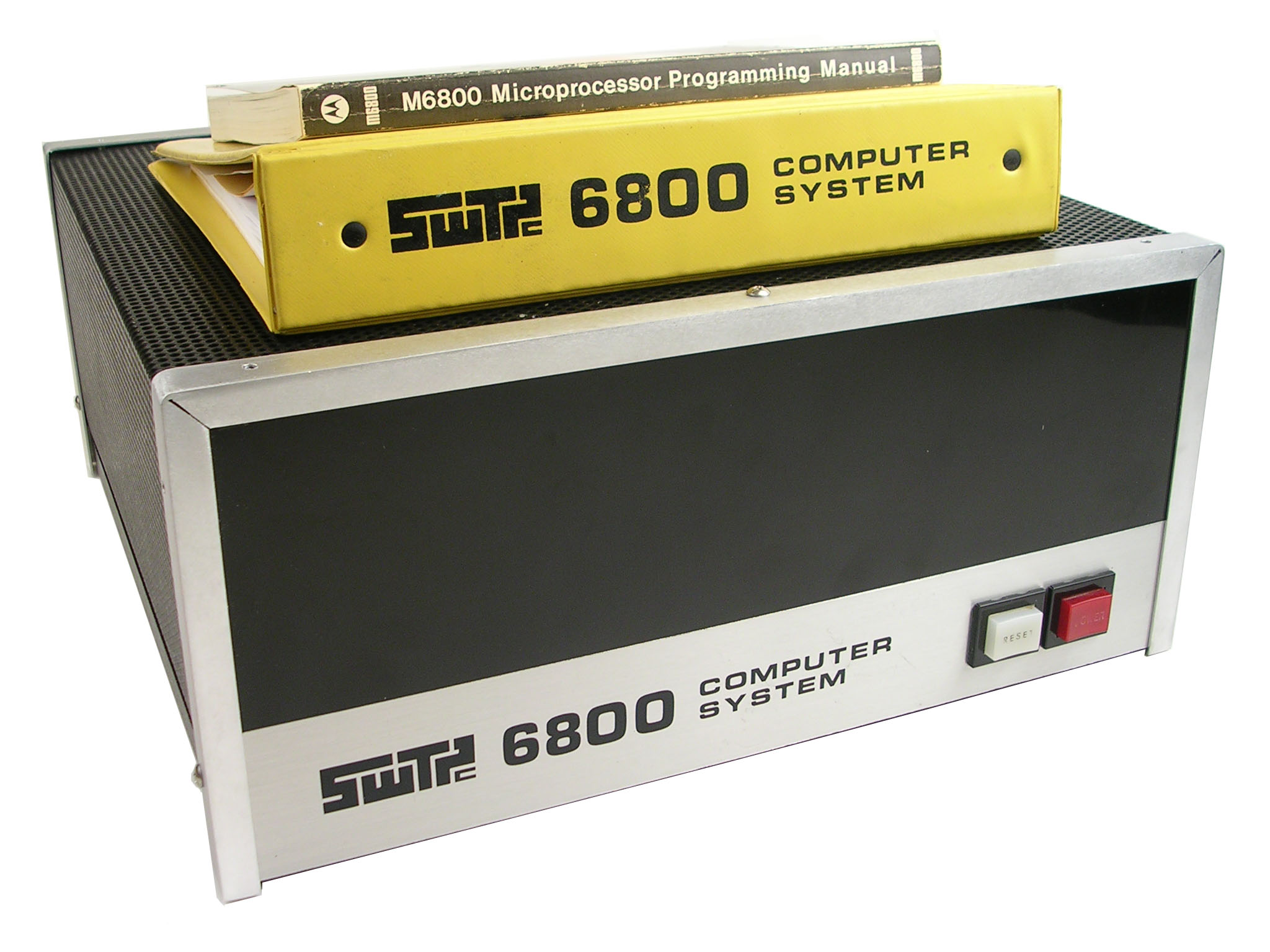
- SWTPC 6800 Microcomputer System
- Trade name: SWTPC
- Predecessor: Daniel E. Meyer Company
- Founded: 1967
- Defunct: 1990
- Successor: Point Systems
- Headquarters: San Antonio, Texas

Southwest Technical Products Corporation, or SWTPC, was an American producer of electronic kits, and later complete computer systems. It was incorporated in 1967 in San Antonio, Texas, succeeding the Daniel E. Meyer Company. In 1990, SWTPC became Point Systems, before ceasing a few years later.

== History ==
In the 1960s, many hobbyist electronics magazines such as Popular Electronics and Radio-Electronics published construction articles, for many of which the author would arrange for a company to provide a kit of parts to build the project. Daniel Meyer published several popular projects and successfully sold parts kits. He soon started selling kits for other authors such as Don Lancaster and Louis Garner. Between 1967 and 1971, SWTPC sold kits for over 50 Popular Electronics articles. Most of these kits were intended for audio use, such as hi-fi, utility amplifiers, and test equipment such as a function generator based on the Intersil ICL8038.

SWTPC also produced some of the earliest commercial light organ kits. These included the single-channel "Sonolite" (1968), capable of controlling 500 watts of lighting, and the more sophisticated "Psychedelia" series (1969–1972), featuring four-channel systems with an 800-watt capacity per channel. The later "Psychedelia II" introduced digital sampling techniques as an alternative to traditional analog filters, switching rapidly between channels to create different visual effects.

Many of these early kits used analog electronics technology, since digital technology was not yet affordable for most hobbyists. Some of the kits utilized new integrated circuits to enable the low-cost construction of projects. For example, the new Signetics NE565 phase-locked loop chip was the core of a subsidiary communications authority (SCA) decoder board, which could be built and added to an FM radio to demodulate special programming (often, background music) not previously available to the general public. FCC regulations did not ban reception or decoding of radio transmissions, but SCA demodulation had previously required complex and expensive circuitry. Another popular new integrated circuit was the Signetics NE555, a versatile and low-cost timing oscillator chip used in signal generators and simple timers. In 1972, SWTPC had a large enough collection of kits to justify printing a 32-page catalog.

In January 1975, SWTPC introduced a computer terminal kit, the "TV Typewriter", or CT-1024. By November 1975, they were delivering complete computer kits based on Motorola microprocessors. They were very successful for the next 5 or so years and grew to over 100 employees.

As the new market evolved rapidly, most companies that sold computer kits in 1975 were out of business by 1978. Around 1987, SWTPC moved to selling point of sale computer systems, eventually changing its name to Point Systems. This new company lasted only a few years.

== Microcomputer pioneers ==
When microprocessors (CPU chips) became available, SWTPC became one of the first suppliers of microcomputers to the general public, focusing on designs using the Motorola 6800 and, later, the 6809 CPUs. The first such microcomputer introduced by the company, in November 1975, was the SWTPC 6800, which is also the progenitor of the widely used SS-50 bus.

Many of SWTPC's products, including the 6800 microcomputer, were available in kit form. SWTPC also designed and supplied computer terminals, chassis, processor cards, memory cards, motherboards, I/O cards, disk drive systems, and tape storage systems. From the older "TV Typewriter" design a video terminal had evolved the CT-64 terminal system, which was an essential part of many early SWTPC systems. Later a more intelligent version of this terminal, the CT-82, was introduced, and a graphical terminal the GT-6144 Graphics Terminal. Still later a SS-50 bus plug-in board, the "Data Systems 68 6845 Video Display Board" was introduced, and a keyboard could be connected to this board. With this solution an external terminal was no longer needed.

SWTPC's SS-50 backplane bus was also supported or used by other manufacturers: (Midwest Scientific, Smoke Signal Broadcasting, Gimix, Helix, Tano, Percom Data, Safetran), etc. It was extended to the SS-64 (for the 68000 CPU) by Helix. SWTPC also designed one of the first affordable printers available for microcomputer users; it was based on a receipt printer mechanism.

Technical Systems Consultants, first of West Lafayette, Indiana (ex Purdue University) and later of Chapel Hill, North Carolina, was the foremost supplier of software for SWTPC compatible hardware. Their software included operating systems (Flex, mini-FLEX, FLEX09, and UniFLEX) and various languages (several BASIC variants, FORTRAN, Pascal, C, assemblers, etc.) and other applications. Other software, from third parties, included Introl's C compiler, Omegasoft's Pascal compiler, the Lucidata Pascal system (from Cambridge, UK), and assorted spread sheets and text processors. By about 1980, TSC had developed a Unix-like multi-user, multi-programming operating system (UniFlex), for 6809 systems with DMA 8" floppy disks and extended memory. Several of TSC's languages were ported to the UniFlex, as was the Lucidata Pascal system.

SWTPC's software catalog included the TSC software, and software from many other sources (including SWTPC itself). Much of it was also available in source code, at a higher price.

Inspired by People's Computer Company's call for Tiny BASICs, Robert Uiterwyk wrote the MICRO BASIC 1.3 interpreter for the SWTPC 6800, which SWTPC published in the June 1976 issue of the SWTPC newsletter. Uiterwyk had handwritten the language on a legal tablet. He later expanded the language to 4K, adding support for floating-point arithmetic; this implementation was unique among BASIC interpreters by using binary-coded decimal to nine digits of precision, with a range up to 10^{99}. An 8K version added string variables and trigonometry functions. Both the 4K and 8K versions were sold by SWTPC. In January 1978, Uiterwyk sold the rights of the source code to Motorola.

== Product gallery ==
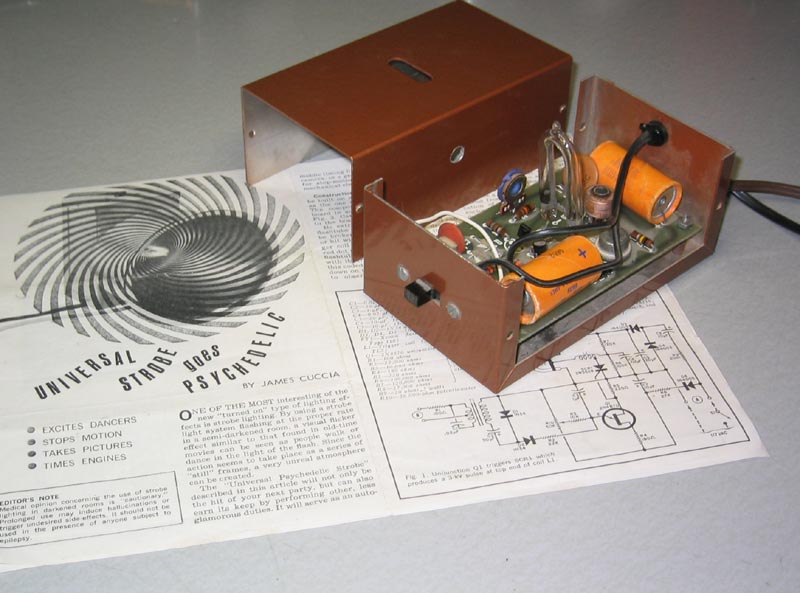
Universal Strobe (1968)

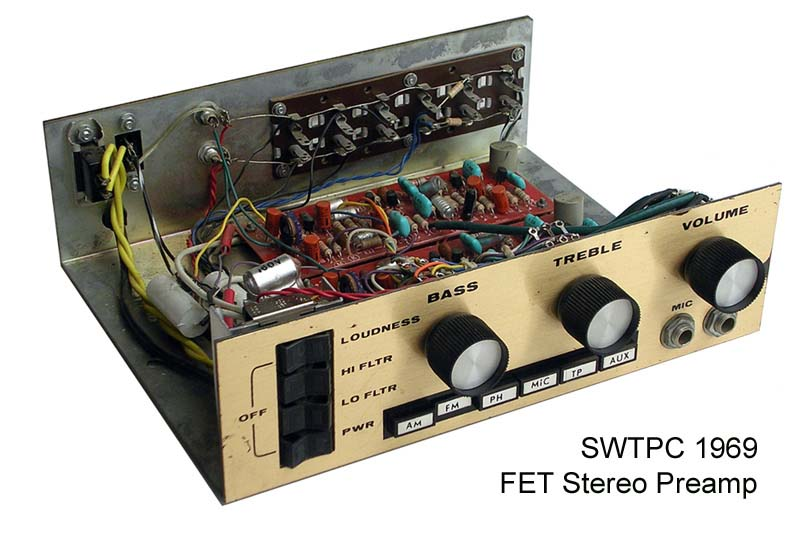
FET Stereo preamplifier (1969)

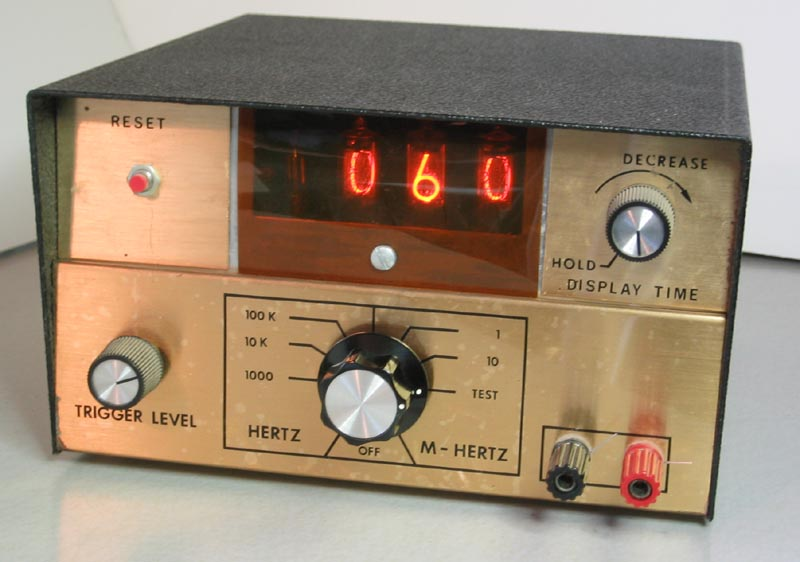
Digital Measurements Lab, Frequency Counter Module (1970)

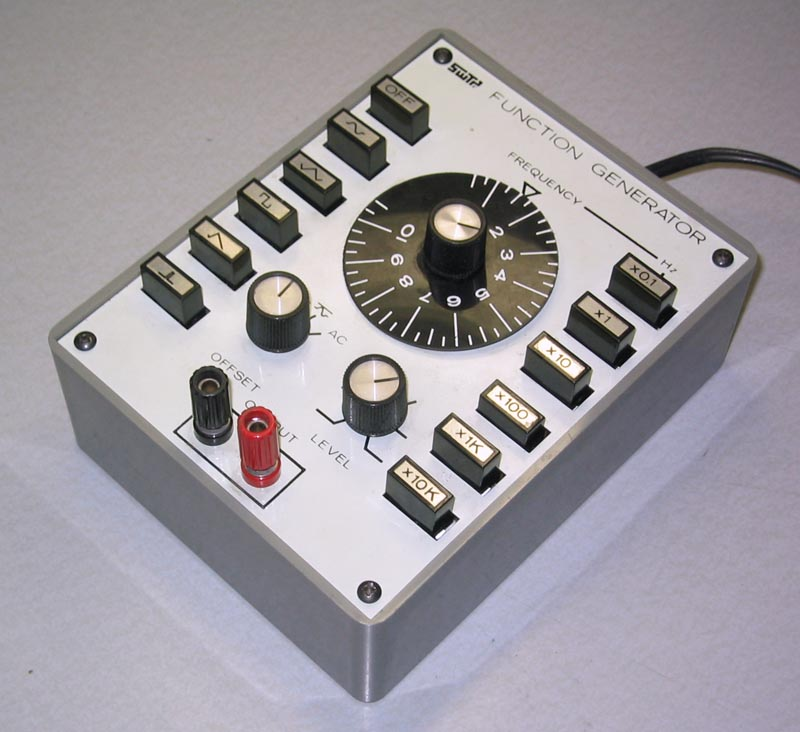
Function Generator based on Intersil ICL8038 (1973)

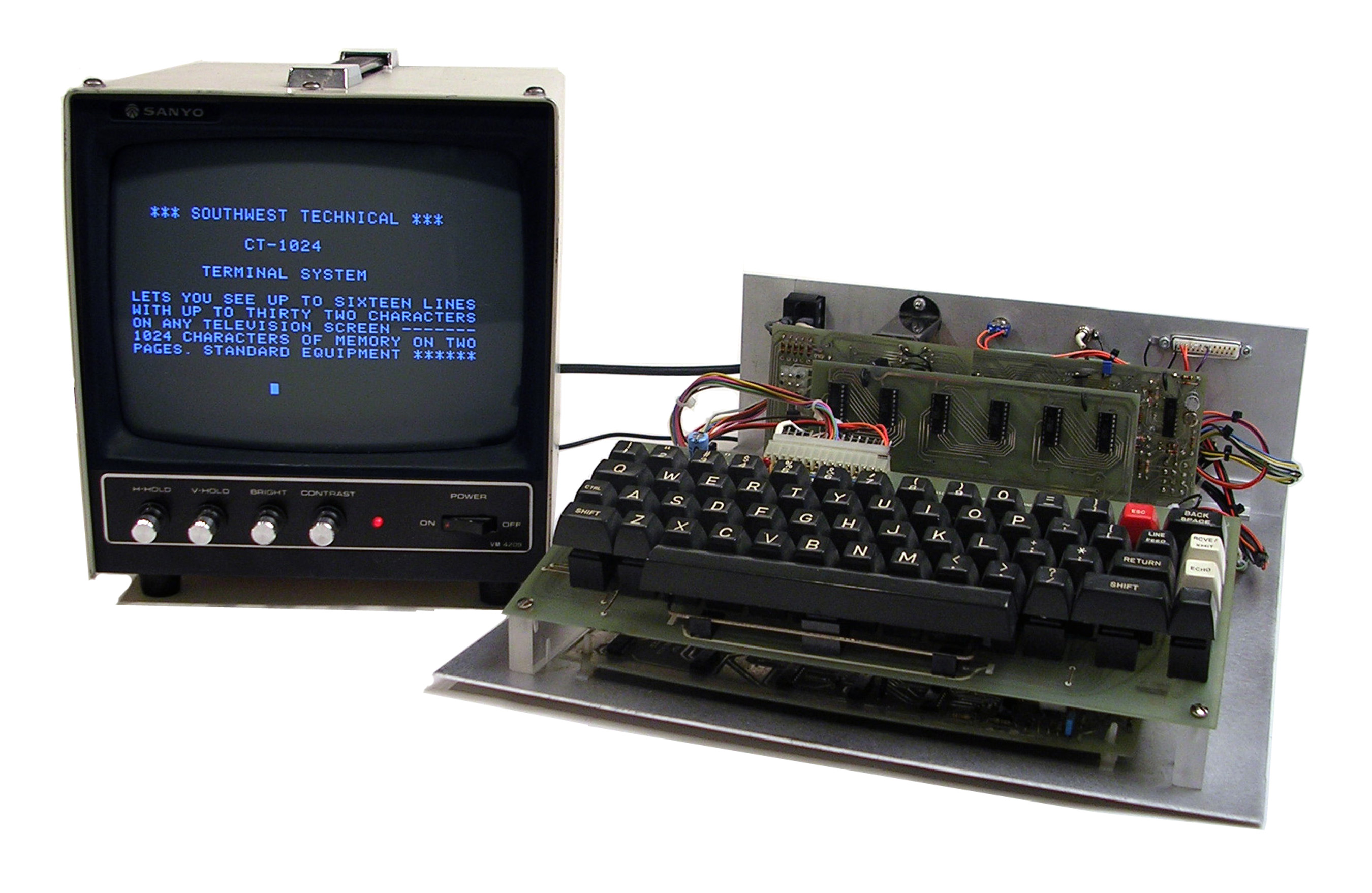
CT-1024 Terminal with monitor (January 1975)

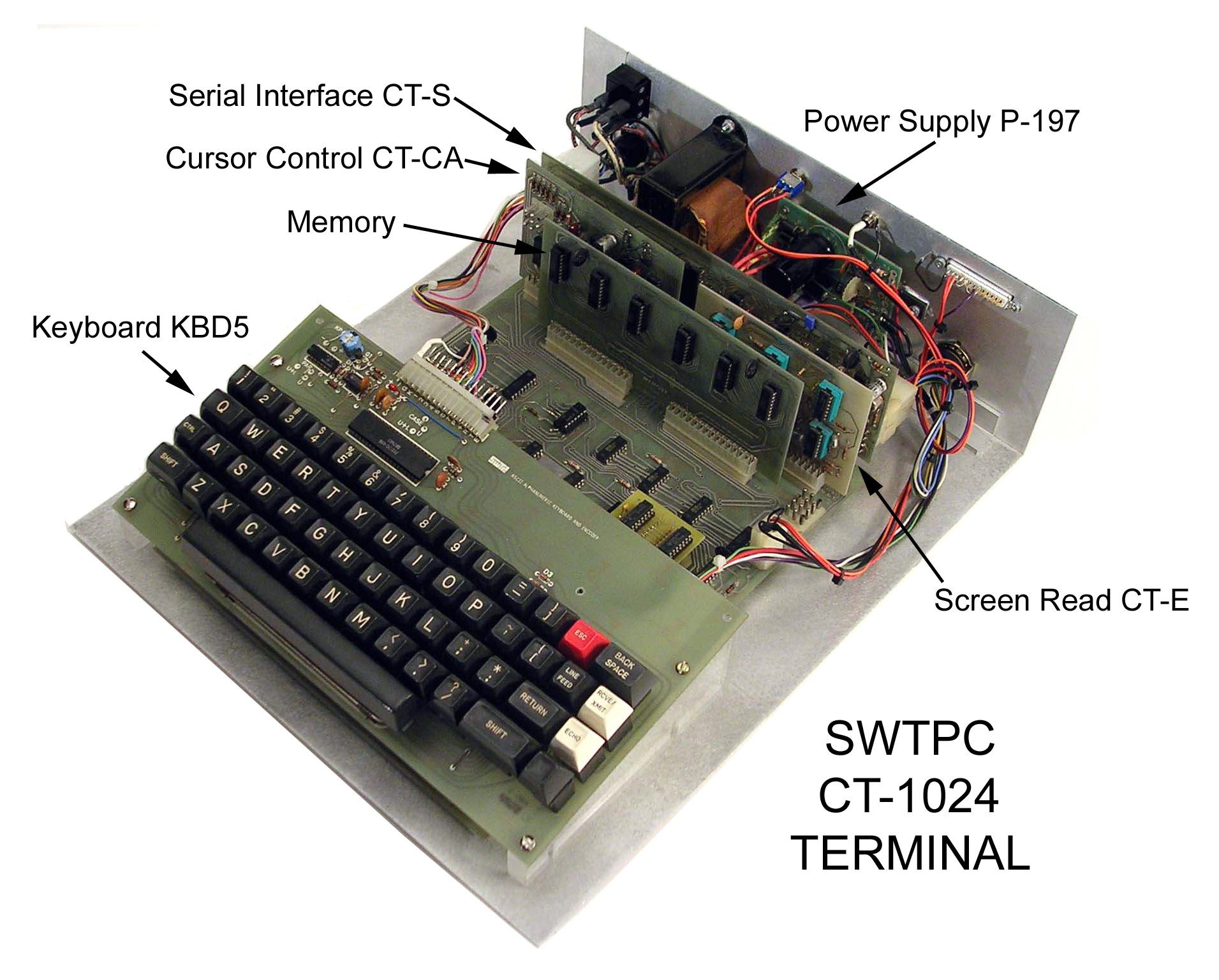
CT-1024 Terminal System (January 1975)

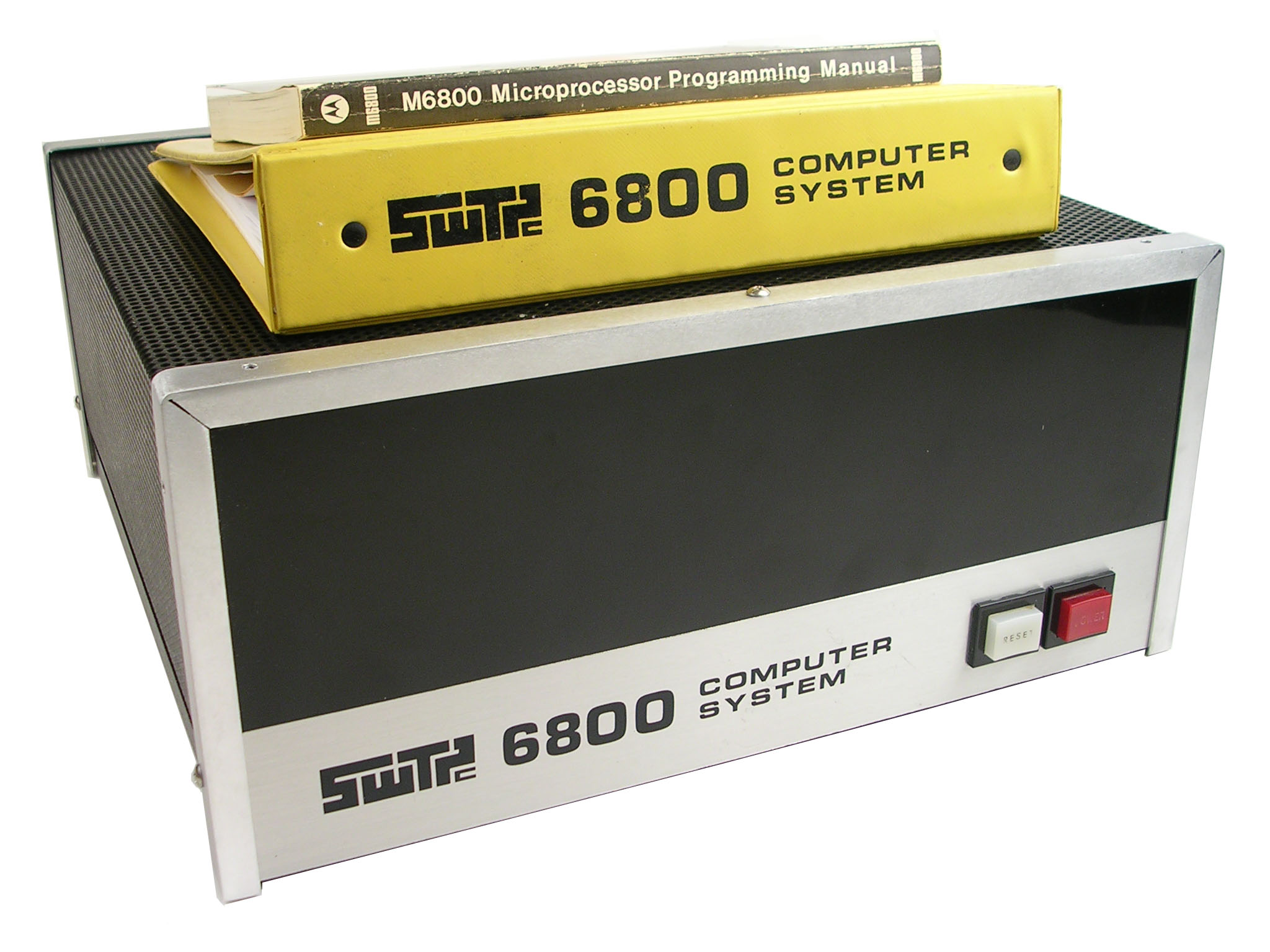
SWTPC 6800 Microcomputer System (November 1975)

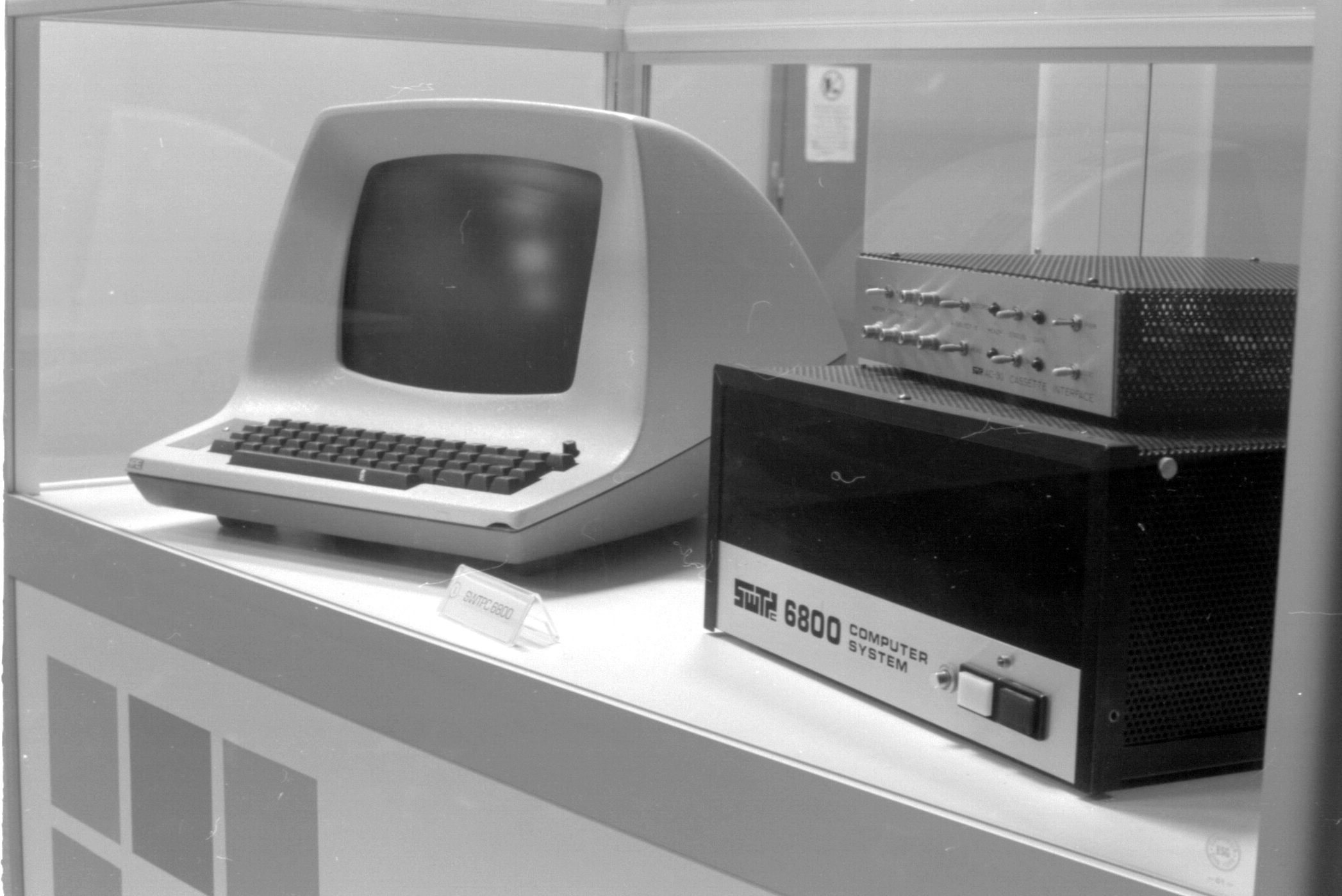
SWTPC 6800 Microcomputer System, with SWTPC AC-30 Cassette Interface, and ADM-3 (November 1975)

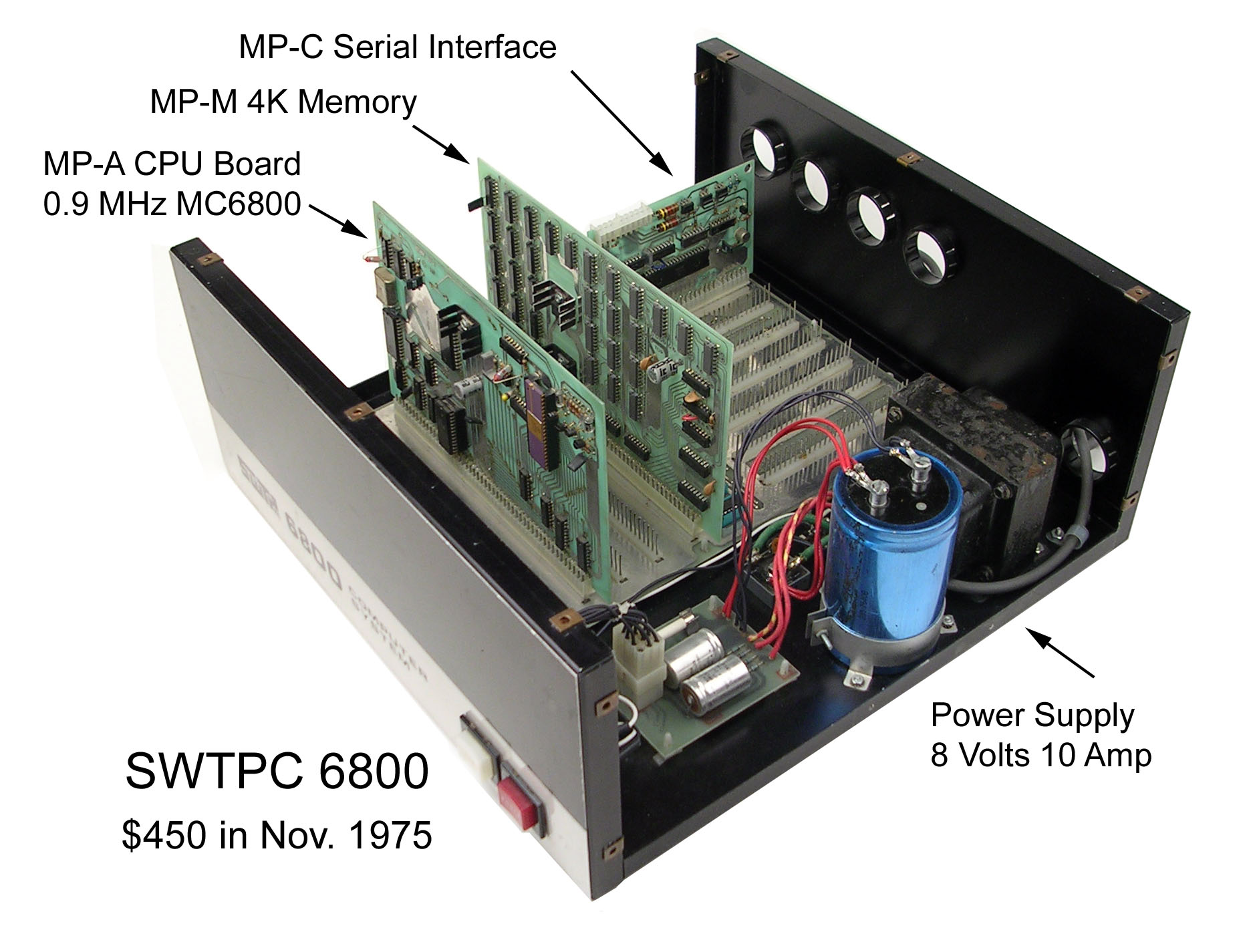
open SWTPC 6800 Microcomputer Case (November 1975)

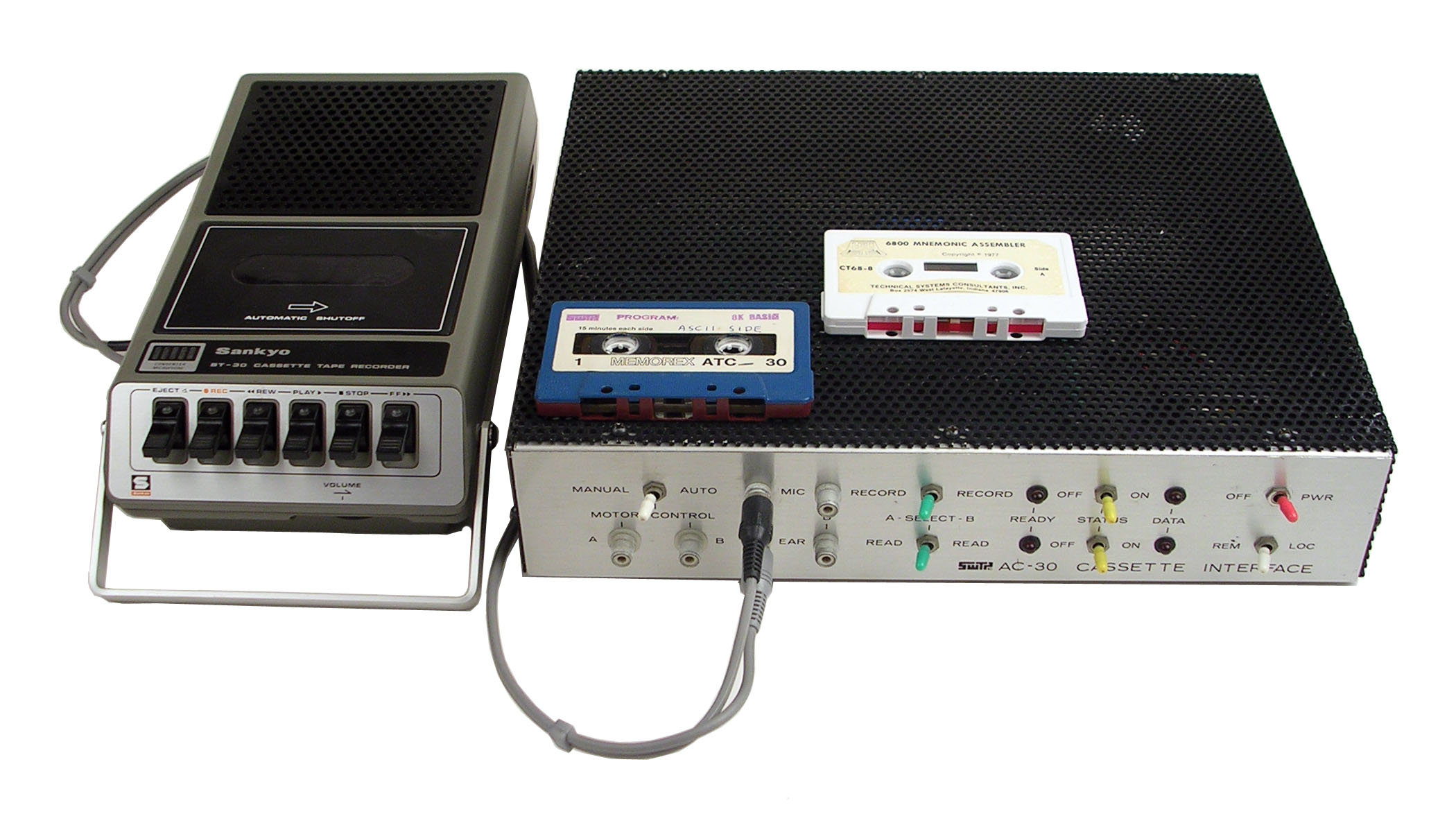
SWTPC AC-30 Cassette Interface (July 1976)
