= Hands-On Electronics =

Hands-On Electronics becomes Popular Electronics

Hands-On Electronics was an electronics hobbyist magazine published by Gernsback Publications in the United States from 1980 to 1989.

== History and profile ==
The magazine started as Radio-Electronics Special Projects in 1980. This was nominally a quarterly supplement to Radio-Electronics that had 10 issues from a single 1980 issue to the Spring 1984 issue. The Summer 1984 issue was renamed Hands-On Electronics. It became bi-monthly in January 1986 and monthly in November 1986. The title was changed to Popular Electronics in February 1989 and was published until December 1999. The longtime Radio Electronics editor, Larry Steckler, was the publisher and owner. (Having purchased Gernsback Publications from the Gernsback family.) Julian S. Martin was the editor.

The early issues were just a collection of construction projects. By 1984 there were monthly columns on shortwave listening, amateur radio, and computers. After Ziff-Davis changed Popular Electronics to Computers & Electronics, Hands-On Electronics attracted those hobbyist readers. In April 1985 Ziff-Davis stopped publishing Computers & Electronics and Hands-On Electronics purchased the title in June 1988. The magazine became monthly and added the Popular Electronics logo to the cover in November 1988. In February 1989 the magazine was published with the name Popular Electronics.
