= Gimix =

American electronics and computer company

Gimix, Inc.
- Type: Private
- Industry: Electronics; Computers
- Founded: 1975; 51 years ago in Chicago, Illinois
- Founder: Robert C. Phillips

Gimix, Inc., was an American electronics and computer company based in Chicago, Illinois, founded by Robert C. Phillips. Established in 1975, the company was initially Phillips's vehicle for selling his various remote-controlled devices he had developed as the result of a life-long interest in electronics and experiments with home automation for himself and other clients. In 1979, the company introduced the first in a series of 68xx-based microcomputers dubbed the Ghost. It proved successful among various businesses and universities and allowed the company to survive into at least the early 1990s. The company's computers were used by game designer Eugene Jarvis to program the popular arcade games Robotron: 2084 and Defender.

== History ==
Gimix was founded in Chicago, Illinois, by Robert C. Phillips in late 1975. Phillips, a life-long electronics enthusiast and high school dropout, had in the early 1970s achieved total automation of his apartment using computerized relay circuits that he designed at the age of 25. This project attracted the attention of Chicago architect Stanley Tigerman, who commissioned him to design the electronics for an automated home based on Tigerman's specifications. Phillips' home automation system for Tigerman worked through radio frequency signals sent wirelessly and through the power line of the house, in a scheme similar to the now-standard X10 protocol.

Phillips soon after incorporated Gimix as a name for his home automation business and as a vehicle for branding his remote-controlled devices. Sometime between its founding and 1978, he hired Richard Don as vice president. In 1978, the company introduced a trio of devices for telephones: the Gimix Hold, which allows a home receiver to put a caller on hold with a custom message; the Gimix Gobbler, which allows a home receiver to distinguish between multiple incoming calls; and the Gimix Auto-Page, which links a phone alarm or answering machine to a paging terminal.

Gimix occupied a 5,000-sq-ft building on W. 37th Place in Chicago. In 1979, the company introduced its first microcomputer that was in essence a clone of Southwest Technical Products Corporation (SWTPC)'s 6800 microcomputer. Named the System 68, Gimix's computer featured an SS-50-bus motherboard (like the SWTPC), with fifteen 50-pin slots and eight 30-pin slots, both gold-plated. Its CPU board featured a Motorola 6800 microprocessor and four Intel 2708 EPROMs, while the system came outfitted with a 16 KB memory board as stock. A number of DIP switches on the boards allowed the system to be configured compatible with software for SWTPC and Midwest Scientific Instruments' computers. A video board allowed for composite output straight from the computer.

The System 68 (also known as the Gimix Ghost) was designed for process control applications, in the home and in industrial automation. The base System 68 and its successors soon found customers as disparate as NASA, Ford Motor Company, DuPont, the Atomic Energy Commission, General Motors, Georgia Tech, and more. Gimix also had a model of microcomputer dedicated entirely to home automation, which in 1980 sold for $10,000 and over (depending on the configuration) and allowed appliances to be operated and monitored for energy consumption and usage patterns and log "important household information". Company president Robert Phillips acknowledged at the time that their computers were too expensive for most homes, and were like a "Hollywood-type toy". In around 1982, the company introduced the Gimix 6809, a conventional computer based on the Motorola 6809, running both OS-9, a UNIX-like operating system, and FLEX, a popular single-user DOS for Motorola-based computers. In 1986, they developed single-board computers and development systems based on the Motorola 68020.

Gimix was still operational in 1991, employing 15 people at their W. 37th Place facility in Chicago.

== Legacy ==
The Gimix 6809 was the development system of choice for Eugene Jarvis, a game designer who programmed the popular arcade games Robotron: 2084 and Defender on the system.
