= TV Typewriter =

Video terminal that could display text on a standard TV set

The September 1973 issue of Radio-Electronics shows Don Lancaster's TV typewriter

The TV Typewriter was a video terminal that could display two pages of 16 lines of 32 upper case characters on a standard television set. The design, by Don Lancaster, appeared on the cover of Radio-Electronics magazine in September 1973.

The magazine included a 6-page description of the design but readers could send off for a 16-page package of construction details. Radio-Electronics sold thousands of copies for $2.00 each. The TV Typewriter is considered a milestone in the home computer revolution along with the Mark-8 and Altair 8800 computers.

Sometimes the term was used generically for any interactive computer display on a screen; until CRT displays were developed, the teleprinter was the standard output medium.

== Don Lancaster's TVT I ==
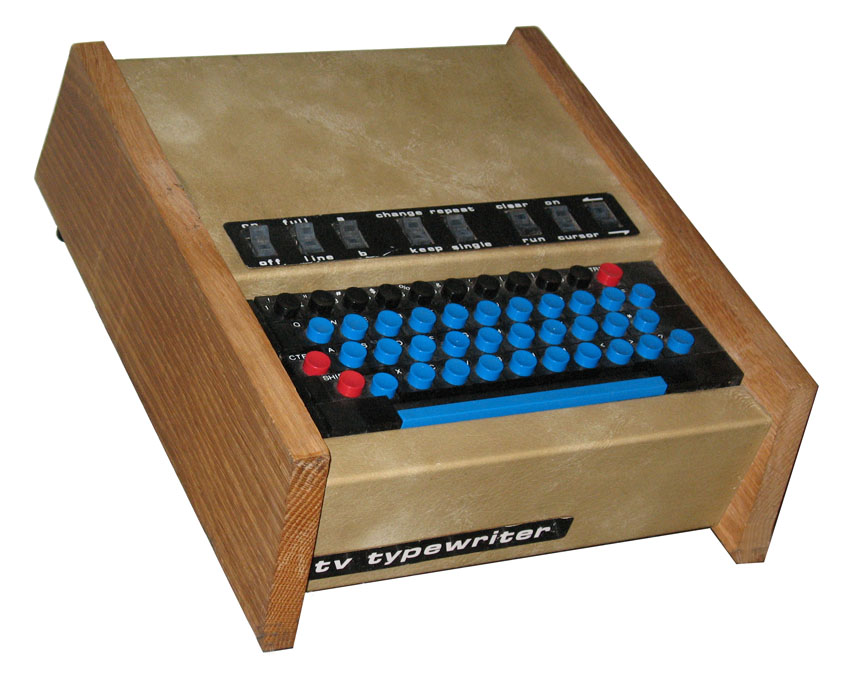
Don Lancaster's prototype TV Typewriter

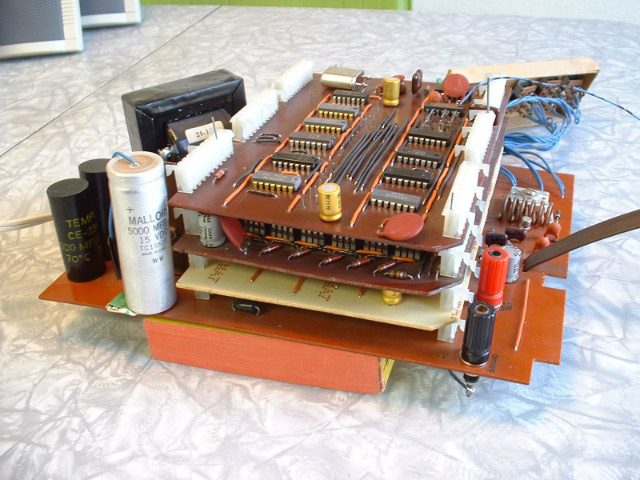
Hobbyist built TV Typewriter

The Signetics 2513 character set

Don Lancaster was an engineer at Goodyear Aerospace designing a high resolution video display for the military. Don was also a prolific author of hobbyist projects for Popular Electronics and Radio-Electronics magazines. The video project gave Don the inspiration for the TV Typewriter.

The system used small-scale integration TTL digital logic and shift register memory. Much of the circuitry was involved in timing the output of the analog generator with the memory, which had to be shifted bit-at-a-time to the output. On-screen text was generated by the Signetics 2513, one of the first character generator integrated circuits.

The article featuring the typewriter appeared in the September 1973 issue. In addition to the six-page article, they also offered to ship out a larger 16-page version with complete layout plans for a mail-in fee of $2. Given its limited functionality, they initially estimated that the magazine would sell about 20 copies of the plans for $20 each. Instead, they were flooded by requests and eventually sent out 10,000 copies.

When the editors were unable to fulfill the requests, they issued an apology (in the November issue) and listed electronics parts sources for the difficult to find components. Don Lancaster also answered a series of reader questions and gave ideas for additional functions and uses for the TV Typewriter. The December issue had a page of corrections for the TV Typewriter booklet. Both of the notices were included in later printings of the booklet.

Despite the compact design and complex circuitry of the typewriter, many finished the project, and some even connected it to their Intel 8008 based computers. The April 1975 issue of the Micro-8 Newsletter has 6 pages of user modifications and interface designs to connect the TV Typewriter to Mark-8 or SCELBI computers. The original TV Typewriter design did not include a serial interface, modem connection, or offline data storage on cassette tape. Don Lancaster wrote about these in the September 1975 issue of BYTE magazine and his TV Typewriter Cookbook. A serial interface board designed by Roger Smith was published in the February 1975 issue of Radio Electronics.

=== Keyboards ===
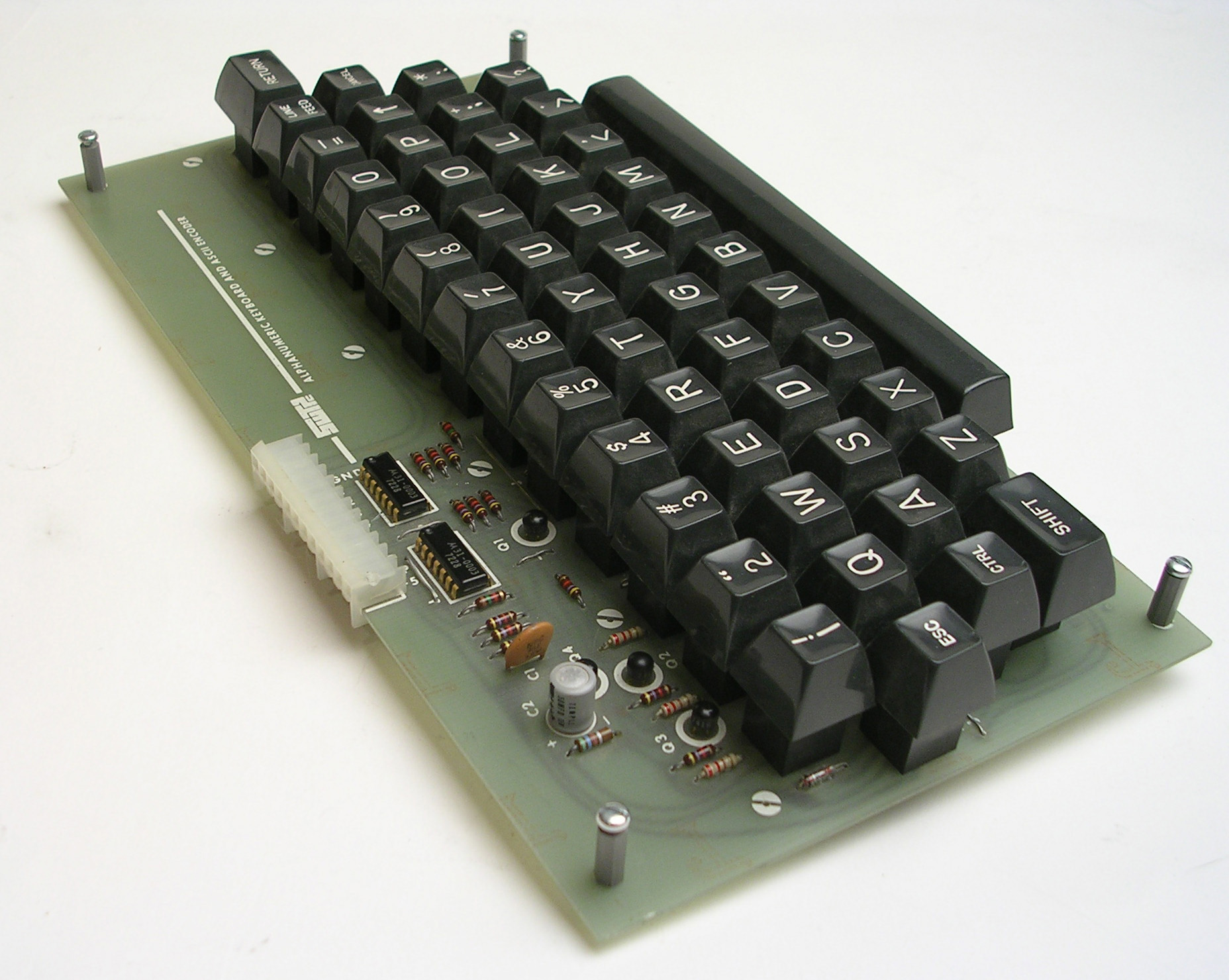
Don Lancaster's $40 Keyboard kit produced by SWTPC.

The TV Typewriter project and kit did not include a keyboard, with the unit on the September cover showing a keyboard project Don Lancaster did in the February 1973 issue. This project involved hand crafting 55 key-switches including fabricating the springs for each key-switch. Most hobbyists chose to use a surplus keyboard and modified it to produce ASCII codes. Don Lancaster's prototype TV Typewriter (now on display at the Computer History Museum) has a surplus keyboard with an ASCII encoder circuit that was published in the February 1974 issue of Radio-Electronics. The plans for this encoder were also included in the TV Typewriter booklet.

Popular Electronics (April 1974) featured a complete keyboard kit designed by Don Lancaster and available from Southwest Technical Products for $39.50. The first version used simple RTL ICs to decode the key matrix. The design was soon improved to use a full featured keyboard encoder IC.

== SWTPC CT-1024 ==
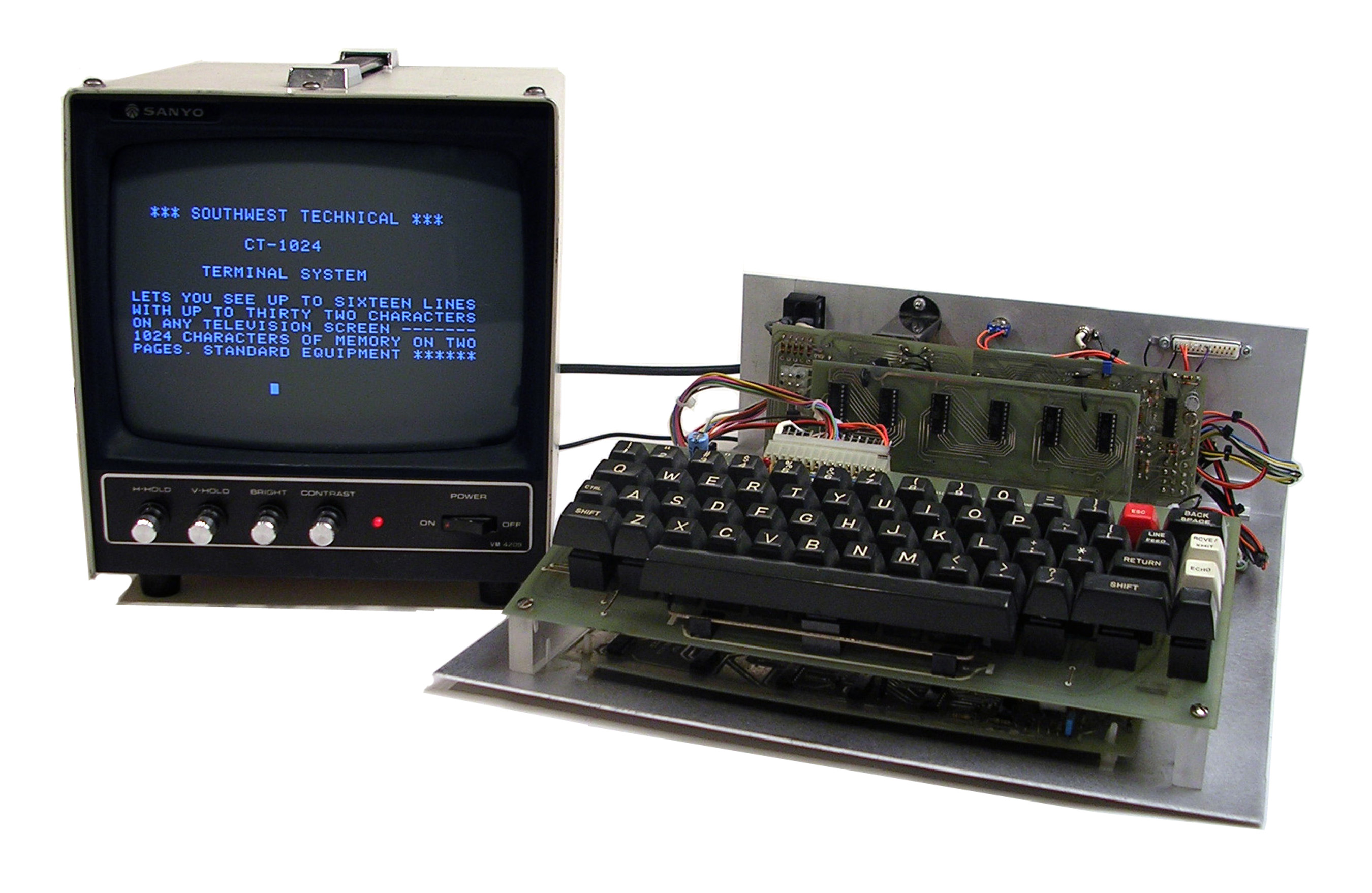
CT-1024 Terminal with monitor

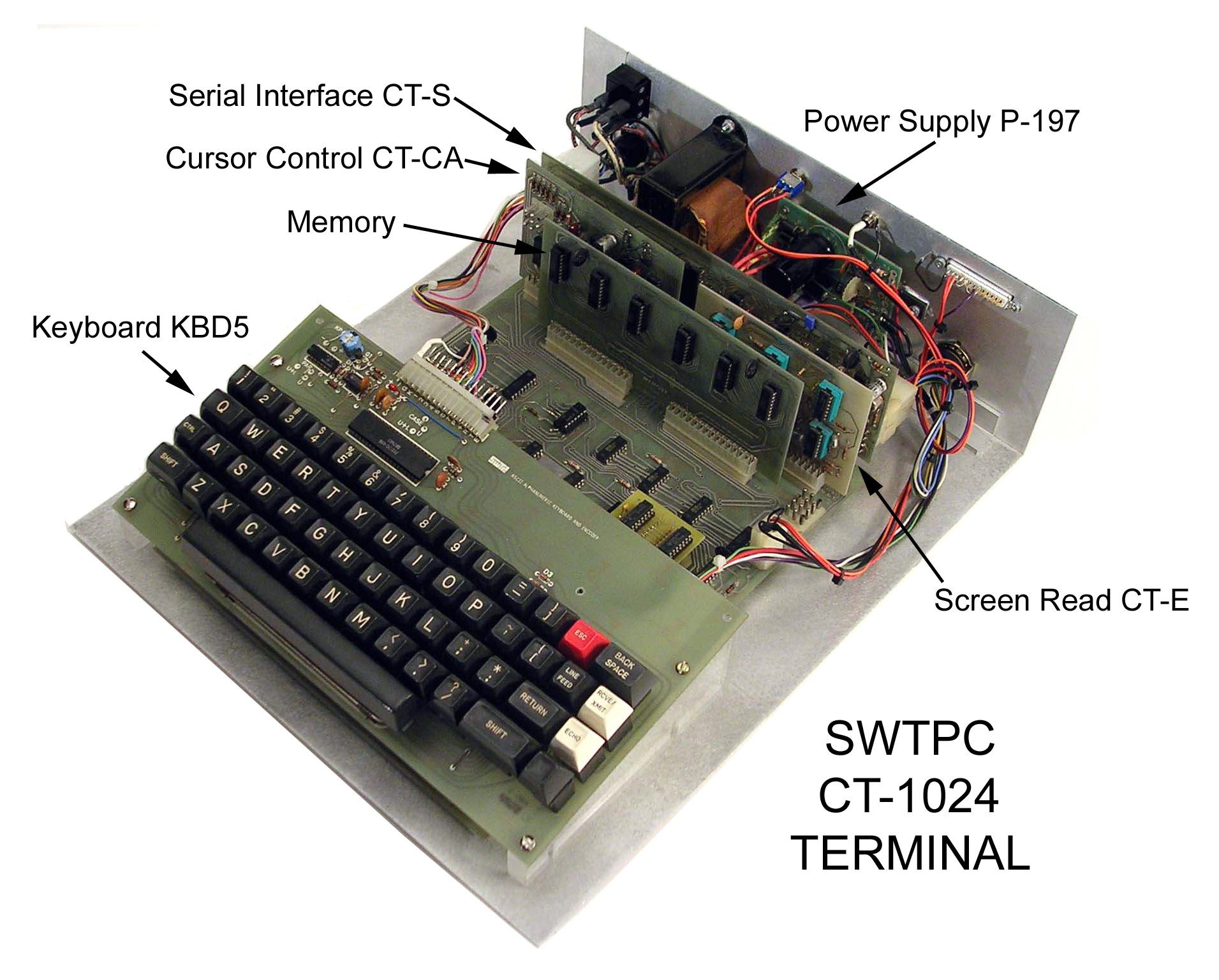
CT-1024 Terminal System

Due to the difficulty of assembly and the phasing out some of the needed ICs, the producer of the TV Typewriter kit, Southwest Technical Products, decided to redesign the kit. The replacement was featured in Radio Electronics as the TV Typewriter II. The complete design was published in 6 issues starting in February 1975.

Daniel Meyer of SWTPC enlisted Ed Colle, an engineer who had worked at Datapoint on terminal design, to design the new TV Typewriter; Colle designed all of the terminal except the keyboard, which was designed by Don Lancaster. The SWTPC CT-1024 Terminal displayed 32 characters by 16 lines without scrolling. It used common TTL parts and 2102 static RAMs. The boards were laid out with very loose part spacing and wide traces, to make it easy to assemble. A complete set of option boards was offered, including a serial interface.

The design was finished by late 1974 and the kits were ready for sale by December 1974, being offered for $275. The first advertisement for the CT-1024 appeared in the January 1975 issue of Popular Electronics on the page facing the Altair 8800 computer article. It was replaced in 1977 by the improved CT-64, which offered scrolling and 64 characters per line of upper and lower case.

== TV Typewriter Cookbook ==
Cover of Don Lancaster's TV Typewriter Cookbook

By 1975, Don Lancaster had written over 100 articles in magazines such as Popular Electronics and Radio-Electronics. He had also written a digital design book titled the RTL Cookbook in 1968. Resistor–transistor logic (RTL) was an early IC technology that was replaced by TTL, so in 1974 he published the TTL Cookbook. This book was in print for 20 years and sold a million copies.

The original TV Typewriter was designed before low cost RAM was available and the design was soon obsolete. Don had made many design improvements and published them as the TV Typewriter Cookbook in 1976. Portions had been serialized in the first issues of Byte magazine. The book was a guide on how to design a video computer terminal, divided into the following chapters:

1. "Some Basics"
2. "Integrated Circuits for TVT Use"
3. "Memory"
4. "System Timing – Calculation and Circuits"
5. "Cursor and Update Circuits"
6. "Keyboards and Encoders"
7. "Serial Interfaces"
8. "Television Interfaces"
9. "Hard Copy and Color Graphics"

This book guided many hobbyist and professionals in designing video displays for home computer systems. The cassette interface design from chapter 7 was the basis for the Kansas City standard. The circuits in this book did not rely on a microprocessor, just TTL. The TV Cheap Video Cookbook (1978) showed the TVT 6 5/8 that would work with a 6502 or 6800 microprocessor. The design was targeted at the KIM-1 Microcomputer.

The original TV Typewriter book cover shows an ASCII keyboard designed by Don Lancaster and sold by Southwest Technical Products. An early computer store chain, the Byte Shop, had the publisher add their logo to the covers and sold the TTL Cookbook and the TV Typewriter Cookbook in their stores. A later edition cover was designed for Radio Shack stores. The ninth printing of the first edition was in 1983.

== Other uses ==
The TV Typewriter found use as a means of communication for deaf people. The typewriter could be connected to a telephone line and messages typed from one recipient to the other in real time.

== See also ==
- History of computing hardware (1960s–present)
- Personal computer

== Bibliography ==
Magazine

- Radio-Electronics; September 1973.

Books

- Lancaster, Don (1969). RTL Cookbook (First ed.). Indianapolis, IN: Howard W. Sams. ISBN 0-672-20715-X.
- Lancaster, Don (1974). TTL Cookbook (First ed.). Indianapolis, IN: Howard W. Sams. ISBN 0-672-21035-5.
- Lancaster, Don (1976). TV Typewriter Cookbook (First ed.). Indianapolis, IN: Howard W. Sams. ISBN 0-672-21313-3.
- Lancaster, Don. TV Typewriter Cookbook (PDF) (Third ed.). Archived (PDF) from the original on March 28, 2022.
- Lancaster, Don (1978). The Cheap Video Cookbook (First ed.). Indianapolis, IN: Howard W. Sams. ISBN 0-672-21524-1.

Construction articles for TVT I

- Lancaster, Don (February 1973). "Low-Cost Keyboards". Radio-Electronics. Vol. 44, no. 2. New York: Gernsback Publications. pp. 54–57, 87–88.
- Lancaster, Don (April 1973). "ASCII Keyboard Encoder". Radio-Electronics. Vol. 44, no. 4. New York: Gernsback Publications. pp. 55–59.
- Lancaster, Don (September 1973). "TV Typewriter". Radio-Electronics. Vol. 44, no. 9. New York: Gernsback Publications. pp. 43–52.
- "TV Typewriter Notes and Comments". Radio-Electronics. Vol. 44, no. 11. New York: Gernsback Publications. November 1973. pp. 16, 22.
- Lancaster, Don (December 1973). "TV Typewriter Corrections". Radio-Electronics. Vol. 44, no. 12. New York: Gernsback Publications. pp. 16, 22.
- Lancaster, Don (February 1974). "Build Improved ASCII Encoder". Radio-Electronics. Vol. 45, no. 2. New York: Gernsback Publications. pp. 59–61, 92–96.
- Garlan, Herman (March 1974). "FCC Warning". Radio-Electronics. Vol. 45, no. 3. New York: Gernsback Publications. p. 86.
- Lancaster, Don (April 1974). "ASCII Keyboard and Encoder". Popular Electronics. Vol. 5, no. 2. New York: Ziff-Davis Publishing. pp. 27–31.
- Smith, Roger (February 1975). "UART and Modem for TV Typewriter". Radio-Electronics. Vol. 46, no. 2. New York: Gernsback Publications. pp. 51–53.

Construction articles for TVT II

- Colle, Ed (February 1975). "TV Typewriter II". Radio-Electronics. Vol. 46, no. 2. New York: Gernsback Publications. pp. 27–30.
- Colle, Ed (March 1975). "TV Typewriter II, Part 2". Radio-Electronics. Vol. 46, no. 3. New York: Gernsback Publications. pp. 56–58.
- Colle, Ed (April 1975). "TV Typewriter II, Part 3". Radio-Electronics. Vol. 46, no. 4. New York: Gernsback Publications. pp. 61–63, 86, 87, 90.
- Colle, Ed (September 1975). "TV Typewriter II Screen-read Board". Radio-Electronics. Vol. 46, no. 9. New York: Gernsback Publications. pp. 56, 57, 76, 77.
- Colle, Ed (November 1975). "TV Typewriter II Manual Cursor Board". Radio-Electronics. Vol. 46, no. 11. New York: Gernsback Publications. pp. 61–63, 86, 87, 90.
- Colle, Ed (April 1976). "Serial Interface For TVT II". Radio-Electronics. Vol. 47, no. 4. New York: Gernsback Publications. pp. 60–62, 80, 81.

Construction articles for TVT-6

- Lancaster, Don (July 1977). "Build the TVT-6: A Low Cost Direct Video Display". Popular Electronics. Vol. 12, no. 1. New York: Ziff-Davis Publishing. pp. 47–52.
- Lancaster, Don (August 1977). "Build the TVT-6: Part II". Popular Electronics. Vol. 12, no. 2. New York: Ziff-Davis Publishing. pp. 49–54. Has video software written in 6502 assembly language for the KIM-1 microcomputer.
- Lancaster, Don (October 1977). "Hex to ASCII Converter for Your TVT-6". Popular Electronics. Vol. 12, no. 4. New York: Ziff-Davis Publishing. pp. 49–52.

TV Typewriter Cookbook serialized in BYTE magazine

- Lancaster, Don (September 1975). "Serial Interface". BYTE. Vol. 1, no. 1. Peterborough NH: Green Publishing. pp. 22–37.
- Lancaster, Don (October 1975). "Television Interface". BYTE. Vol. 1, no. 2. Peterborough NH: Green Publishing. pp. 20–33.
- Lancaster, Don (November 1975). "The In and Outs of Volatile Memories". BYTE. Vol. 1, no. 3. Peterborough NH: Green Publishing. pp. 12–17.
- Lancaster, Don (December 1975). "Read Only Memory Technology". BYTE. Vol. 1, no. 4. Peterborough NH: Green Publishing. pp. 64–69.
