= Smoke Signal Broadcasting =

American computer company

Smoke Signal Broadcasting, Inc.
- Type: Private
- Industry: Computer
- Founded: 1976; 50 years ago
- Founder: Ric Hammond
- Defunct: March 8, 1991; 35 years ago
- Headquarters: United States
- Products: BFD-68; Chieftain; VAR/68K

Smoke Signal Broadcasting, Inc. (SSB), later known as Smoke Signal, was an American computer company founded in 1976 by Frederic Jerome "Ric" Hammond of Hollywood, California. The company earned its reputation by offering expansions for the Southwest Technical Products (SWTPC) 6800 microcomputer. It later manufactured its own line of computers, called the Chieftain. Though it remains little-known, Smoke Signal was an early and important manufacturer of multi-user computer systems.

Hammond, an enthusiast of radio who worked at CBS as a programming director, set out his company to act as a consulting business for broadcast entities but quickly leaned into the computer industry. According to Byte, Smoke Signal Broadcasting was the first third-party company to offer expansions for SWTPC. Their floppy disk drive system expansion and accompanying OS-68 operating system proved such a success that it spurred the development of the Chieftain, itself running OS-68. While later iterations of the Chieftain won praise for technical merit, the refusal to invest in a centralized source of software turned off some customers.

Following the company's poor performance in the mid-1980s, Hammond relegated Smoke Signal Broadcasting to the status of a support line for existing customers before disestablishing it in 1991. He formed another corporation in 1987, this time in the real estate industry, but this proved short-lived after the housing market collapsed in Ventura County. Hammond later revisited his original passion of radio in a couple of professional settings before his death in 2012.

== 1976–1980: Foundation, expansions, and microcomputers ==
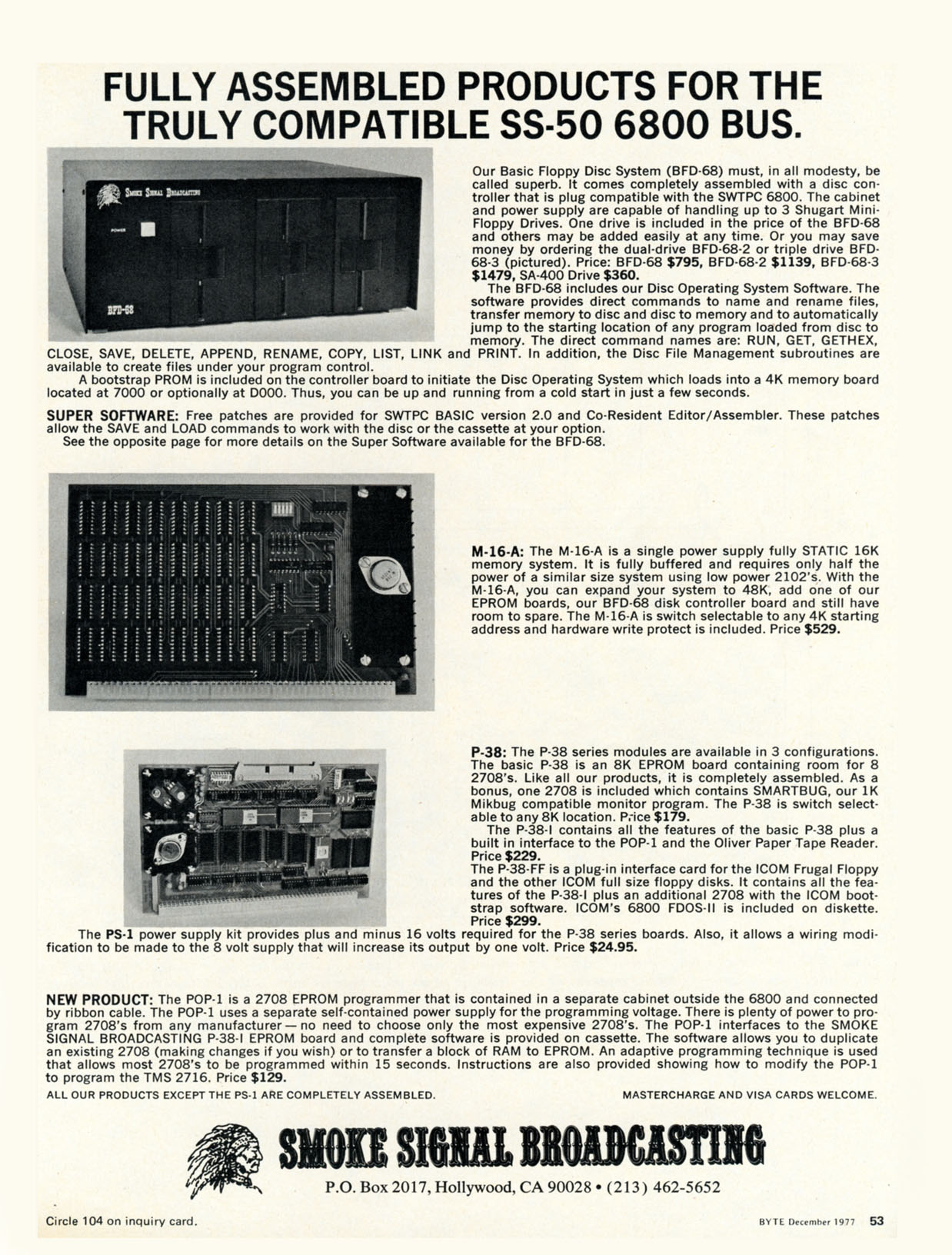
Advertisement for Smoke Signal's BFD-68 floppy system, the M-16-A RAM board, and the P-38 EPROM board

External image
- Smoke Signal Chieftain at the Computer Closet

Ric Hammond, graduate of the Thacher School and UC Santa Barbara, founded Smoke Signal Broadcasting in 1976. The company was first headquartered in Hollywood, California. Hammond had been an enthusiast of radio since at least the early 1960s; he was named president of the Thacher School's Amateur Radio Club when it opened up in 1962. During Smoke Signal's founding years, he simultaneously worked as programming director at CBS Radio's KNX-FM station in Los Angeles. He started Smoke Signal as a consulting business for broadcast entities. Hammond maintained a keen interest in computers since the early 1970s, having taken a three-day course at Motorola to learn how to build a computer at the board level, but intended to keep Smoke Signal relevant to his interest in radio. However, after learning about the dearth of memory expansion and peripherals for the SS-50 bus used by the highly popular Southwest Technical Products 6800 microcomputer, Hammond rectified this by designing the M-16-A, a 16 KB static RAM board, marketing it as a Smoke Signal product.

Released in late 1976, according to Byte magazine, the M-16-A was the first expansion board manufactured independently of Southwest Technical Products for the SWTPC 6800. It was an instant success, with Hammond quickly becoming overwhelmed with orders for the board. By 1977, the company had fully shifted its business to offering expansions for the SWTPC. In the next year, they released a 5.25-inch floppy disk drive system, the BFD-68. This system housed up to three drives in one cabinet and came with a controller board to plug into the SS-50 bus of the SWTPC 6800, as well as OS-68, a disk operating system similar to Technical Systems Consultants's FLEX that provided the SWTPC 6800 with a random-access file system.

The BFD-68 also proved popular among users of the SWTPC 6800 and inspired Smoke Signal to release their own microcomputer based on the Motorola 6800 microprocessor in 1978, after having moved to Westlake Village, California. Called the Chieftain, this computer came equipped with a nine-slot motherboard with SS-50 compatibility, 32 KB of RAM—expandable up to 60 KB—two serial ports, either two 5.25-inch or two 8-inch floppy drives, and an 80-by-25 character display.

Smoke Signal aimed the Chieftain at scientific engineers and came included with OS-68. It sold the computer both directly to businesses and through computer retailers. The company offered the Chieftain only as an assembled computer—a somewhat unusual approach when most companies sold their computers as kits to be assembled by the end user, who were usually hobbyists. Hammond felt that this approach would both serve as a value-add for hobbyists and would make it appealing to the non-hobbyist buyer. The Chieftain's use of a cooling fan and gold-plated edge connectors for reliability was also relatively novel for 6800-based computers, as noted by Personal Computing magazine. The Chieftain's case bore a faux-leather finish, according to technologist Bill von Hagen, in keeping with Smoke Signal's Native American corporate identity. The computer soon found commercial buyers among Hughes Aircraft and Western Electric, who used it for industrial process control. Computer journalist and collector Michael Nadeau called the Chieftain one of the best SWTPC-based computers ever made.

Smoke Signal released a single-board computer a year after the Chieftain, called the SCB-68. It featured the same 6800 processor as the Chieftain but only 1 KB of scratch-pad RAM and 2 KB of EPROM standard. Users could add 18 KB worth of additional EPROMs as well as a math co-processor, a real-time clock, and serial ports. The company adopted design elements of the SS-50 bus for this single-board computer.

== 1980–1984: Restructuring ==
At the start of the next decade, Smoke Signal directed their focus away from the scientific engineering market to manufacturing systems for businesses. Despite this, Hammond strove to appeal to hobbyists in their manufacturing and marketing decisions, explaining that many corporate buyers of the time were themselves former electronics hobbyists. Their first entry to the business market was an update to the original Chieftain, aptly named the Chieftain Business System. Smoke Signal retained SS-50 compatibility but replaced the 6800 processor with a Motorola 6809, bumped the amount of RAM to 64 KB—upgradable to 1 MB—and removed compatibility with 5.25-inch disks but added two more 8-inch disk drives as well as a 20 MB Winchester hard disk drive. A daisy wheel printer and a dumb terminal came with the system's base configuration.

By 1982, Smoke Signal began phasing the "Broadcasting" from their name and stopped offering expansions for other computers. Early in the same year, the company introduced the Chieftain 9822, an update to the Business System featuring the same processor and static RAM options, as well as the same nine-slot bus equipped with the first two Chieftains. Smoke Signal restored the option to equip the system with either two 8-inch or two 5.25-inch floppy drives and brought in a new model of Winchester drive with a capacity between 4 MB to 60 MB. This Chieftain spanned two units: one for the disk drives, the other for the processor, memory, and disk controller. Purchasers could choose either an updated version of OS-68 for the Motorola 6809—its name now shortened to Smoke Signal DOS—or Microware's multi-tasking, multi-user, "Unix-comparable" operating system, OS-9. Smoke Signal DOS was free of charge, while OS-9 cost an additional US$195. A system configured with Smoke Signal's choice of dumb terminal and printer cost around US$8149. The Chieftain's two units could be mounted under a desk or stacked on top of each other.

Benchmark tests performed on twenty-five sub-US$25,000 computers by the Association of Computer Users rated the Chieftain 9822 second-best in the categories of scientific computing and data processing. The Chieftain was rivaled in these respective categories only by a considerably more expensive system by Wang Laboratories and a comparably priced but bare-bones system by Altos Computers. While computer reviewers praised the speediness of the Chieftain, criticism was leveled at Smoke Signal's reliance on third-party dealers to provide the software to the purchasers. As most dealers tuned their selection of software to the industries in their vicinity, dealers offered very little in terms of generalized software—in some cases having to commission developers for a requested piece of software—leaving some purchasers sore on the machine.

Smoke Signal had by 1983 established an international presence, with dealers and equipment fabricators presiding in Australia, Asia, Europe, and South Africa, as well as the United States. According to Hammond in 1981, the fabricators and dealers split the handling of the company's dealings roughly 60–40 respectively. The Electronic Company of New Zealand rebadged the Chieftain Business Machine as an "Econz" machine in 1981. A year later, Smoke Signal formed a joint venture with Medco Electronics of Pakistan to market several of Smoke Signal's computers in the region under the name Pakistan Computers.

== 1984–1991: Unix systems and decline ==
While Smoke Signal's choice of OS‑9 forced them to claim having only a "Unix‑comparable" operating system at hand, the company had earlier introduced the VAR/68, a system powered by Motorola's 6809 microprocessor and running Microware’s OS‑9 operating system. In 1984 the company followed with their first microcomputer allowed to be marketed as Unix-compatible. Called the VAR/68K, this computer came included with Regulus, a Unix‑compatible operating system developed by the Alcyon Corporation. Although the SS‑50 bus design had fallen out of popularity by the time the company released their previous Chieftain, Smoke Signal remained loyal to their roots with regard to the VAR/68K. The computer was powered by Motorola's 16‑/32‑bit 68000 microprocessor and featured four parallel ports and 16 serial ports. Smoke Signal equipped a later iteration of the VAR/68K with a 68008.

The mid-1980s marked the decline of Smoke Signal. In the year of the VAR/68's introduction, the company employed 25 people and generated US$2 million the preceding year; five people left by 1985, while their assets were valued at US$1 million. By 1987, only 15 employees remained. It was this year that Smoke Signal moved their headquarters for the last time, to Thousand Oaks, California. Hammond used these headquarters to incorporate Amerasian Development, his break into the real estate business, relegating Smoke Signal to the status of a support line for their existing customers. This venture proved short-lived after the collapse of the real estate market in Ventura County bankrupted Hammond. He filed Smoke Signal's final corporate statement in 1991.

Hammond revisited his original interest in radio during the 1990s and early 2000s, first becoming a disc jockey for KHAY and later a traffic reporter for KABC. He died in 2012.

== Software ==
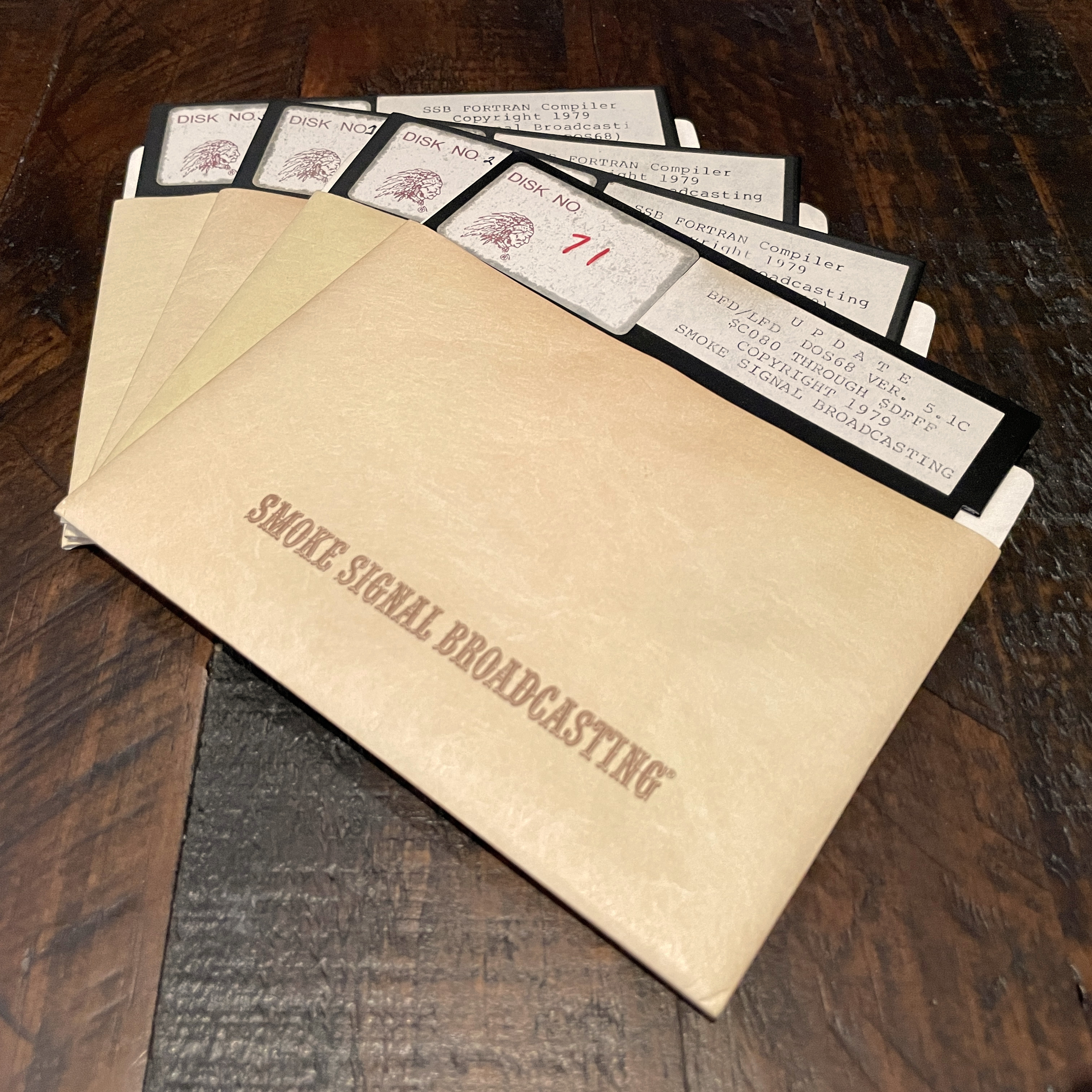
Stack of Smoke Signal software on 5.25-inch floppy disks, including OS-68

Besides hardware, Smoke Signal also sold numerous software titles for use with their own OS-68. The company's software division was helmed by Roger Embree, who also developed OS-68. Smoke Signal's broad selection of software won the company first place in sales against other SS-50 disk drive systems, due in part to their preference for licensing software from other companies for resale with Smoke Signal's trademarks. However, by 1982, the software division was a weak spot for Smoke Signal, and the company pushed the responsibility of providing software to its 120 dealers. Smoke Signal required these dealers to join an exchange in which they received a monthly newsletter listing the other dealers' software titles. Dealers could acquire titles through direct contact with each other. This exchange was managed by Deborah Conrad and ran on Smoke Signal's in-house MicroCobol database management system. According to Conrad, this system was intended to lessen the burden of software development on the dealers, allowing them to focus on marketing computers. In practice, however, this had the opposite effect.

The dialect for the implementation of BASIC in OS-68 was borrowed from another software company's BASIC—with additions by Embree—as was the included binary editor and assembler. Although licensed, the original software developer of the BASIC dialect, Computer Software Services, went unattributed in Smoke Signal's official documentation. The company also resold Technical Systems Consultants's text editor and word processor as the SE-1 and TP-1 respectively. Released in 1978, these software packages won Smoke Signal praise in a rave review in Creative Computing magazine. Smoke Signal's adaptation of TSC's disassembler meanwhile was scorned in Kilobaud magazine. Other suppliers of software for Smoke Signal include Ed Smith's Software Works, Microware Systems, and Computer Software Services—the latter of whose Random-Access Disk File BASIC was deemed much better than the rebranded BASIC implementation of theirs which Smoke Signal used.
