= SWTPC 6800 =

1975 microcomputer

SWTPC 6800 Computer System

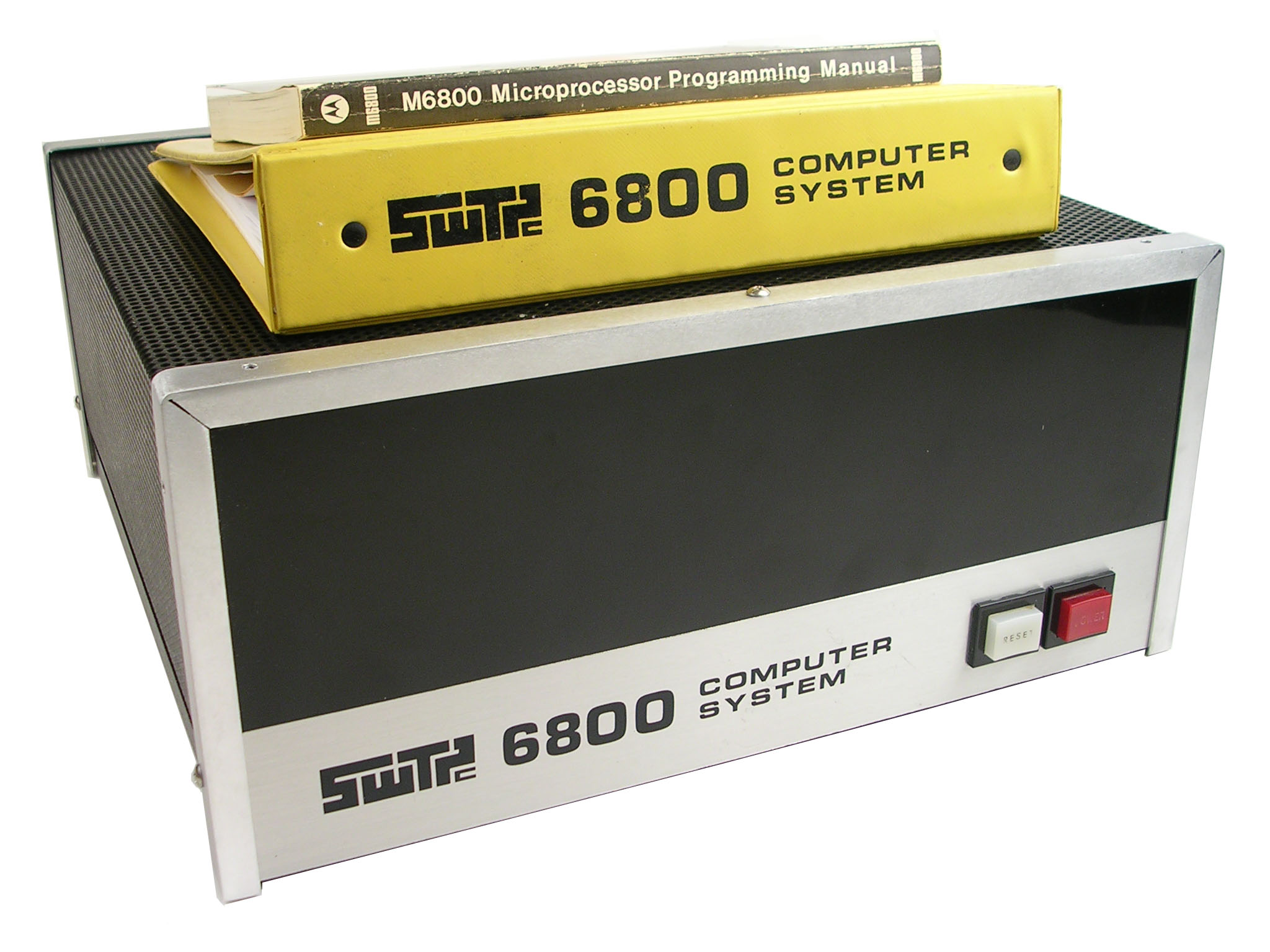
- Developer: Southwest Technical Products Corporation (SWTPC)
- Manufacturer: SWTPC
- Released: November 1975
- Introductory price: US$450 (equivalent to $2,600 in 2024)
- CPU: Motorola 6800
- Memory: 4 KB (stock)
- Graphics: ASCII terminal output
- Dimensions: 6.75 by 15 by 15.375 inches (17.15 cm × 38.10 cm × 39.05 cm)

The SWTPC 6800 Computer System, simply referred to as SWTPC 6800, is an early microcomputer developed by the Southwest Technical Products Corporation and introduced in 1975. It was built around the Motorola 6800 microprocessor, from which it gets its name. The SWTPC 6800 was one of the first microcomputers based around the Motorola 6800.

The SWTPC 6800 is the progenitor of the widely used and broadly supported SS-50 bus. The SWTPC 6800 became one of the most popular 6800-based systems of its time, owing to its ease of use and ample documentation. Though rudimentary, the MIKBUG resident monitor built into ROM allows the immediate entry of program data after power-up, as opposed to other microcomputers of its day which required bootstrapping such software. Southwest Technical Products introduced the SWTPC 6800 in November 1975 for US$450 (equivalent to $2,600 in 2024) in kit form only. Any contemporary ASCII terminal can be used to interface with the SWTPC 6800. SWTPC sold their own television-set-based terminal, for $275; a crude dot-matrix printer was another optional accessory, for $250.

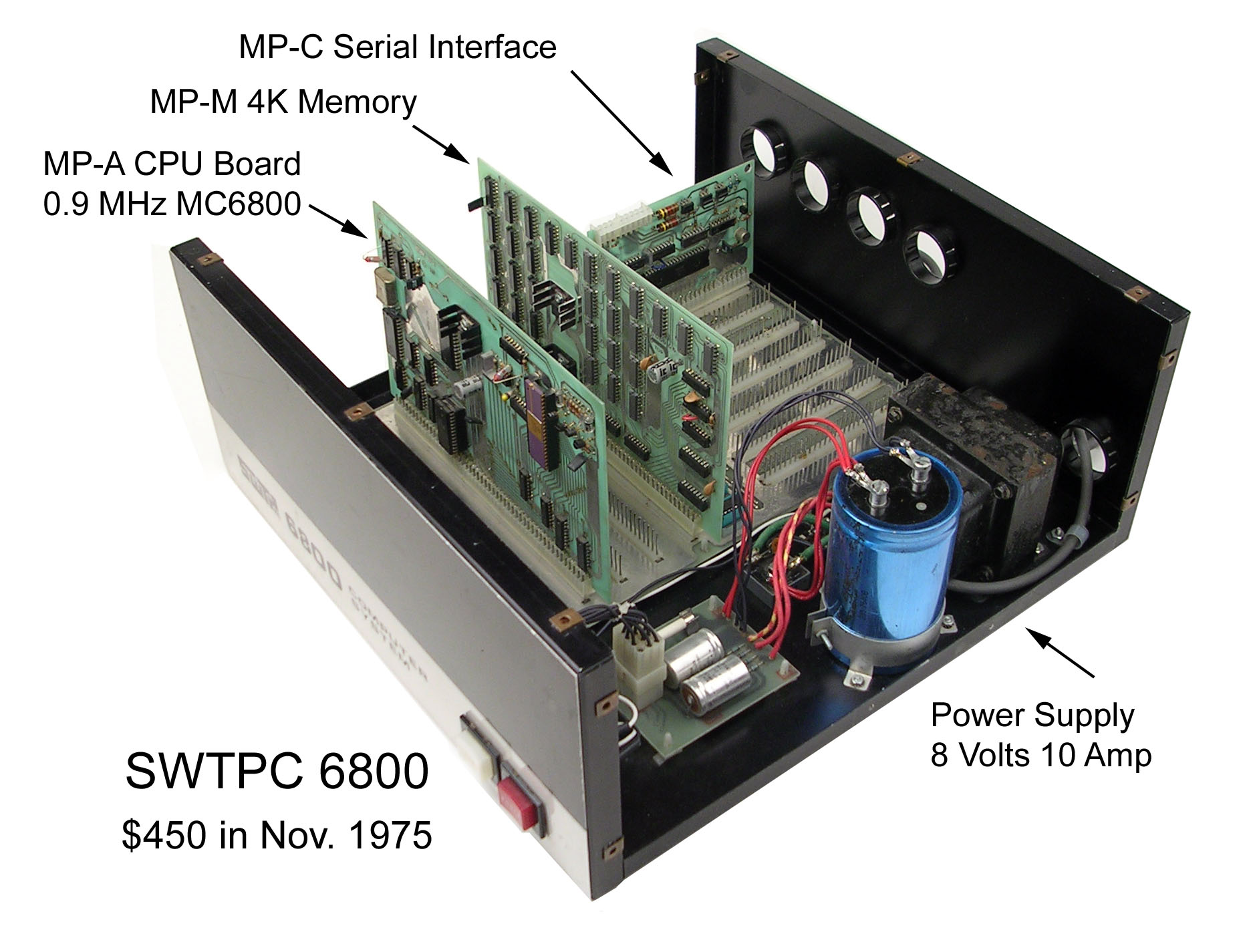
Diagram of the SWTPC 6800's internals

Southwest Technical Products followed up the 6800 with the S/09 in 1979 and the 69/K, 69/A, and 69/56 in 1980. All four replaced the Motorola 6800 processor of the original with its successor the 6809. The SWTPC 6800 can be converted to a S/09 with a system board kit sold by Southwest Technical Products, which is also compatible with existing 6800 peripherals and cards; while the 69/K, 69/A, and 69/56 features a redesigned system board and chassis that is incompatible with the 6800. The 69/K was sold as a kit, while the 69/A and 69/56 came pre-assembled (the latter featuring 56 KB of RAM as opposed to the 69/A's 8 KB).

== Specifications ==
SWTPC 6800 specifications
Date introduced	Microprocessor	Clock speed (kHz)	Stock RAM size (KB), width	Dimensions
1975	Motorola 6800	980	4 KB, 8-bit	6.75 by 15 by 15.375 inches (17.15 cm × 38.10 cm × 39.05 cm)

== See also ==
- Chieftain, a clone by Smoke Signal Broadcasting
- FLEX (operating system)
