= SS-50 bus =

Computer bus for 8-bit systems

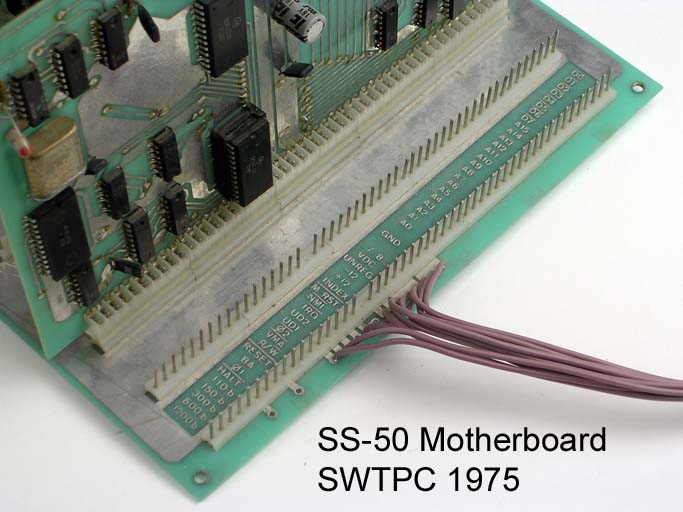
- Year created: November 1975; 49 years ago
- Created by: Southwest Technical Products Corporation

The SS-50 bus was an early computer bus designed as a part of the SWTPC 6800 Computer System that used the Motorola 6800 CPU. The SS-50 motherboard would have around seven 50-pin connectors for CPU and memory boards plus eight 30-pin connectors for I/O boards. The I/O section was sometimes called the SS-30 bus.

Southwest Technical Products Corporation introduced this bus in November 1975 and soon other companies were selling add-in boards. Some of the early boards were floppy disk systems from Midwest Scientific Instruments, Smoke Signal Broadcasting, and Percom Data; an EPROM programmer from the Micro Works; video display boards from Gimix; memory boards from Seals. By 1978 there were a dozen SS-50 board suppliers and several compatible SS-50 computers.

In 1979 SWTPC modified the SS-50 bus to support the new Motorola MC6809 processor. These changes were compatible with most existing boards and this upgrade gave the SS-50 Bus a long life. SS-50 based computers were made until the late 1980s.

The SS-50C bus, the S/09 version of the SS-50 bus, extended the address by four address lines to 20 address lines to allow up to a megabyte of memory in a system.

Boards for the SS-50 bus were typically 9 inches wide and 5.5 inches high. The board had Molex 0.156 inch connectors while the motherboard had the pins. This arrangement made for low cost printed circuit boards that did not need gold plated edge connectors. The tin plated Molex connectors were only rated for a few insertions and were sometimes a problem in hobbyist systems where the boards were being swapped often. Later systems would often come with gold plated Molex connectors.

The SS-30 I/O Bus had the address decoding on the motherboard. Each slot was allocated 4 address (the later MC6809 version upped this to 16 address.) This made for very simple I/O boards, the Motorola peripheral chips connected directly to this bus. Cards designed using the SS-30 bus often had their external connectors mounted such that they were accessible outside the computer chassis when installed in SWTPC motherboards.

== SS-50 and SS-30 gallery ==
Click the images to enlarge.

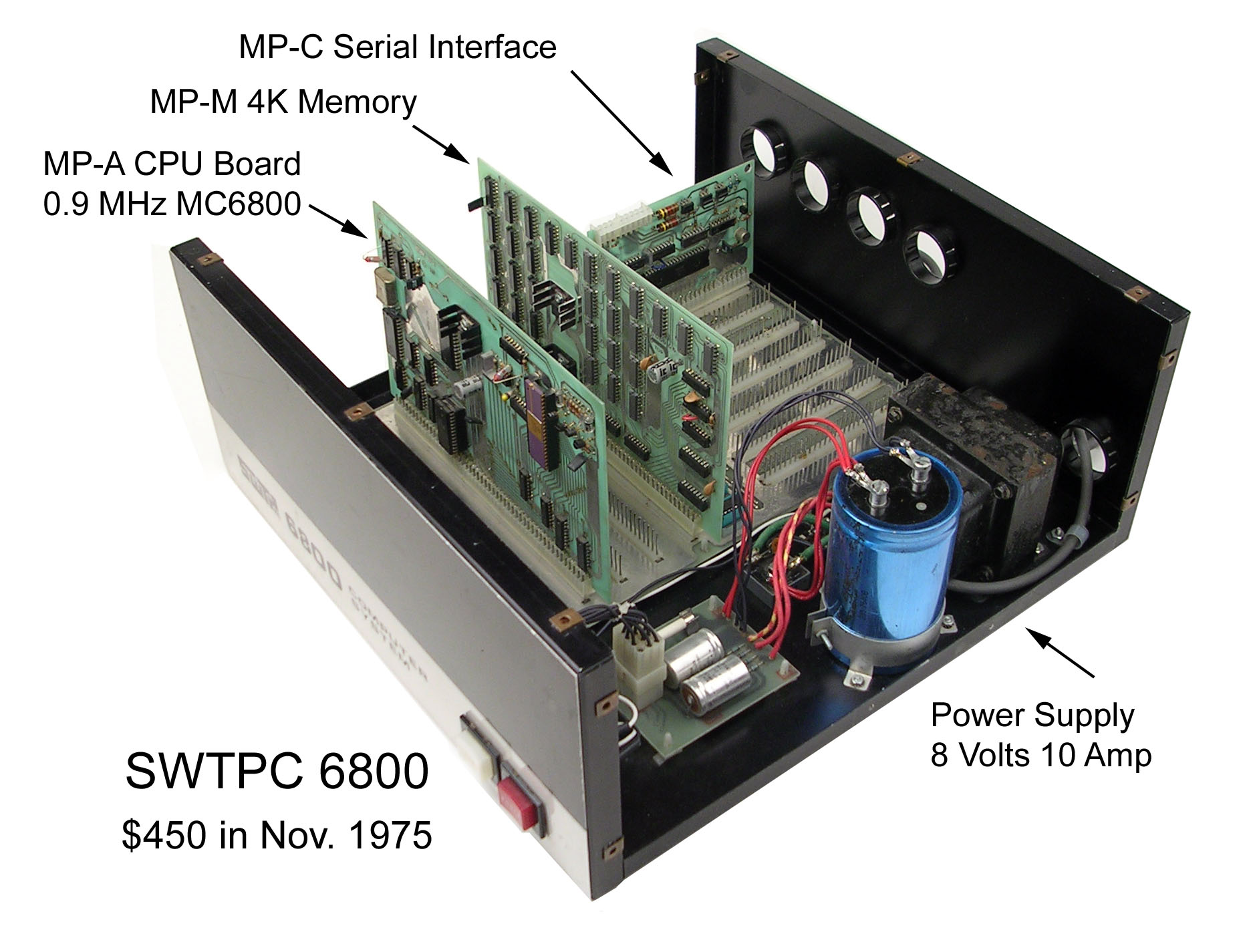
SWTPC 6800 microcomputer system

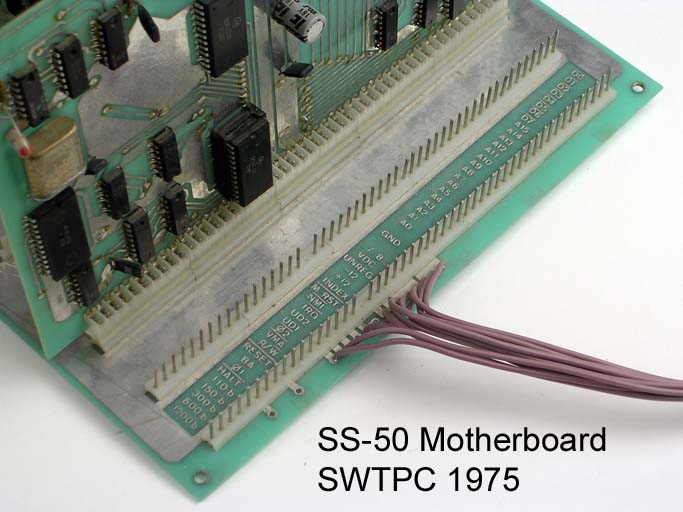
SWTPC SS-50 Bus

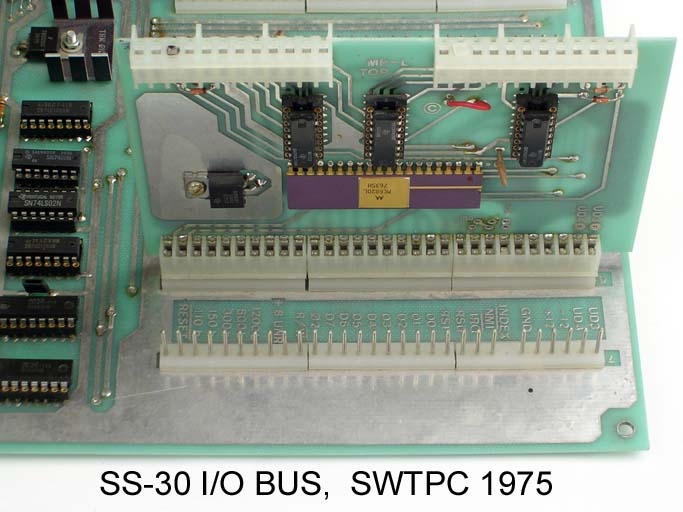
SWTPC SS-30 I/O Bus
