= Don Lancaster =

American writer and engineer (died 2023)

- Born: Donald E. Lancaster; 1939/1940
- Died: June 7, 2023 (aged 83); Mesa, Arizona, US
- Known for: Author
- Website: tinaja.com

Donald E. Lancaster was an American author, inventor, and microcomputer pioneer.

== Early life ==
Don graduated from North Allegheny High School in Wexford, Pennsylvania. He received a BSEE degree from Lafayette College in 1961, and a MSEE from Arizona State University in 1967. While attending ASU, Lancaster started on a master's degree in anthropology, but he never earned the degree.

== Career ==
Lancaster was an engineer, at Goodyear Aerospace in Phoenix, Arizona, who also wrote multiple articles for computer and electronics magazines of the 1970s, including Popular Electronics, Radio-Electronics, Dr. Dobb's Journal, 73 Magazine, and Byte. He has written books on electronics, computers, and entrepreneurship, both commercially published and self-published.

One of his early projects was "TV Typewriter" serial terminal. The design was accepted by early microcomputer users as it used an ordinary television set for the display and could be built for around US$200 in parts, at a time when commercial terminals like the ADM-3A were selling for over $1,000.

Lancaster was an early advocate and developer of what is now known as print-on-demand technology. Lancaster produced his self-published books by re-purposing the game port of an Apple II to transfer PostScript code directly to a laser printer, rather than using a Macintosh running PageMaker. This enabled continuous book production using an inexpensive Apple II, rather than tying up an expensive Macintosh until the print run was complete.

He formerly held a ham radio license (K3BYG).

On June 7, 2023, at the age of 83, Lancaster died, having lived for 44 years in Thatcher, Arizona.

== Publications ==
IC books

- RTL Cookbook (1ed, 1969) (3ed, 2010, ISBN 0-672-20715-X, archive)
- TTL Cookbook (1ed, 1974, ISBN 0-672-21035-5, archive)
- CMOS Cookbook (1ed, 1977) (4ed, 2019, ISBN 0-672-21398-2, archive)
- Active Filter Cookbook (1ed, 1975) (2ed, 1995, ISBN 0-75062986-X, archive)

Project books

- TV Typewriter Cookbook (1ed, 1976) (3ed, 2010, ISBN 0-67221313-3, archive)
- Cheap Video Cookbook (1ed, 1978, ISBN 0-672-21524-1, archive)
- Son of Cheap Video (1ed, 1980, ISBN 0-672-21723-6, archive)

Apple books

- Assembly Cookbook for Apple II/IIe (1ed, 1984) (3ed, 2011, ISBN 978-1-882193-16-5)
- Enhancing Your Apple II - Volume 1 (1ed, 1985, ISBN 0-672-21846-1)
- Enhancing Your Apple II and IIe - Volume 2 (1ed, 1985, ISBN 0-672-21822-4)
- Applewriter Cookbook (1ed, 1986, ISBN 0-672-22460-7)

Programming books

- The Hexadecimal Chronicles (1981) ISBN 0-672-21802-X
- Don Lancaster's Micro Cookbook (Sams, 1982) ISBN 0-672-21828-3

Other

- The Incredible Secret Money Machine (1978) ISBN 0-672-21562-4
- The Incredible Secret Money Machine II (1978) ISBN 978-1-882193-12-7
- Book-On-Demand Resource Kit
- The Case Against Patents: Selected Reprints from "Midnight Engineering" & "Nuts & Volts" Magazines (Synergetics Press, January 1996). Paperback ISBN 1-882193-71-7
