= Radio-Electronics =

American electronics magazine

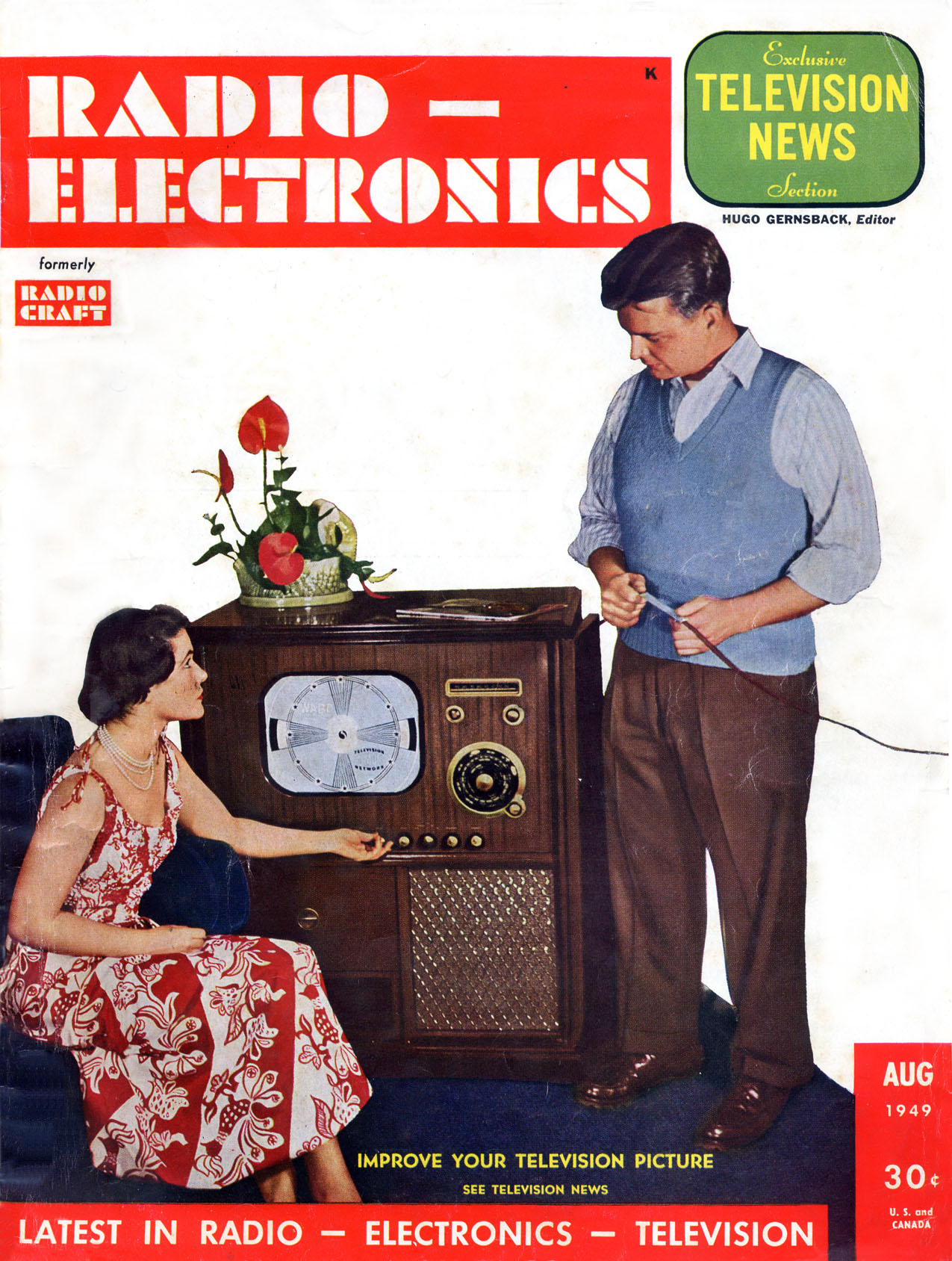
- The August 1949 issue of Radio-Electronics with Radio-Craft tag line.
- Publisher: Electro Importing Company
- First issue: July 1929; 96 years ago (as Radio-Craft)
- Final issue: January 2003

Radio-Electronics was an American electronics magazine that was published under various titles from 1929 to 2003. Hugo Gernsback, sometimes called the father of science fiction, started it as Radio-Craft in July 1929. The title was changed to Radio-Electronics in October 1948 and again to Electronics Now in July 1992. In January 2000 it was merged with Gernsback's Popular Electronics to become Poptronics. Gernsback Publications ceased operations in December 2002 and the January 2003 issue was the last. Over the years, Radio-Electronics featured audio, radio, television and computer technology. The most notable articles were the TV Typewriter (September 1973) and the Mark-8 computer (July 1974). These two issues are considered milestones in the home computer revolution.

== Earlier publications ==
In 1905, Hugo Gernsback established Electro Importing Company to sell radio components and electrical supplies by mail order. The catalogs had detailed instructions on projects like a wireless telegraph outfit and were the predecessor of his first magazine, Modern Electrics (April 1908). Gernsback sold Modern Electrics in March 1913 and it became Electrician and Mechanic. In May 1913 he started another magazine, The Electrical Experimenter. Gernsback was an enthusiastic supporter of amateur radio. Gernsback started a magazine devoted to radio, Radio Amateur News (July 1919.) The title was shortened to Radio News in July 1920.

Radio News was a very successful magazine that enabled Hugo Gernsback and his brother Sidney to build a publishing empire. Amazing Stories was introduced in April 1926 and was the first magazine devoted to science fiction. In 1925 they launched the radio station WRNY. This was the first radio station to broadcast experimental television starting in 1928.

In February 1929, Gernsback's Experimenter Publishing was forced into bankruptcy. Everything was sold to pay off the creditors. At the last court proceeding in April 1929, Hugo Gernsback announced a new publishing company. "Mr. Gernsback said after the hearing that his new magazines would be Radio Craft, Science Wonder Stories and Air Wonder Stories and that the first issues would be out in June."

The beginning of the Great Depression was not the best time to start a magazine but Radio-Craft survived. The paper shortages during World War II were even more difficult for magazines. Gernsback had to merge Radio and Television into Radio-Craft. A few months were combined such as the January–February 1942 and the August–September 1942 issues. The material shortages eased and the growing electronics industry during the war led to more advertisers and readers.

== Radio-Electronics ==
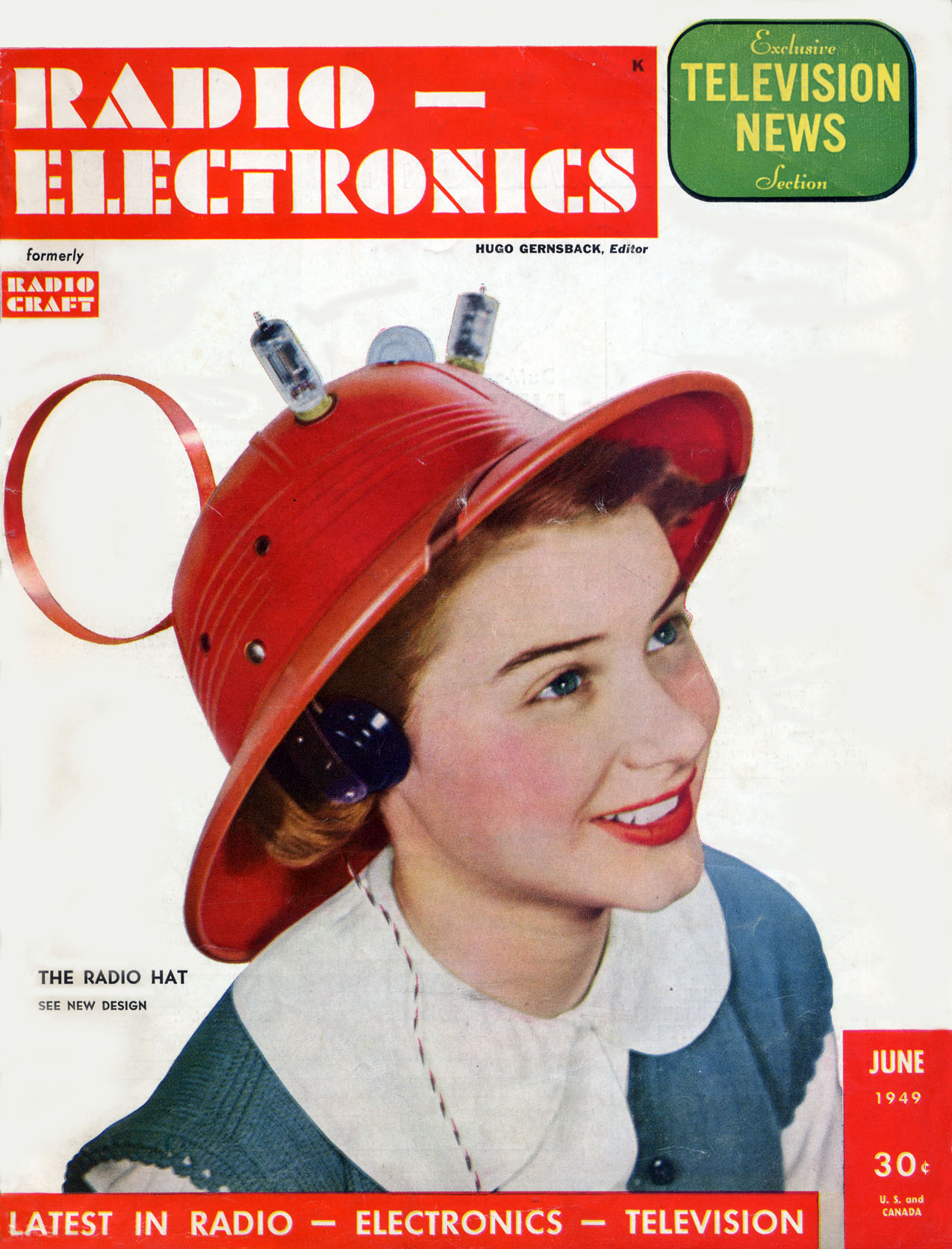
Hope Lange models a radio hat on the cover of Radio-Electronics (June 1949)

Hugo Gernsback first used the term "Television" in the December 1909 issue of his Modern Electrics magazine. By the late 1940s, television stations and home receivers were becoming a reality. Gernsback felt his Radio-Craft magazine needed a new name; it should be short and contain the word "Television". When the staff could not decide on a name, they sent a survey to 500 readers with 13 proposed names. Over 50% of the readers selected a name that was included just to expand the list, Radio-Electronics. Gernsback accepted his readers' verdict and used the title that did not include the magic word of the period. Radio-Electronics appeared as a subtitle in early 1948 and became the primary title in October 1948.

=== 1950s and 1960s ===
Early radios and televisions used vacuum tubes that had an operating lifetime of a year or so. (The transistor would not become dominant until the 1970s.) A typical television would have a dozen vacuum tubes and one or more would fail each year. Radio and TV repair shops were numerous and located in every neighborhood. A significant portion of Radio-Electronics articles and advertisements addressed the service industry.

Technological advances such as the transistor, color television, stereo audio, computers and space satellites were prominently covered in the 1950s and 1960s. The typical Radio-Electronics cover would show a person interacting with new technology. Hugo Gernsback would write an editorial each issue; and the magazine would publish stories about the future such as automobiles automatically guided down the turnpikes of tomorrow. The April 1959 issue was 8.5 by 11 inches (22 by 28 cm) and had 140 pages. The monthly paid circulation was about 200,000 readers.

=== 1970s ===
The tag line on the Radio-Electronics cover from July 1970 to February 1974 was "For Men With Ideas In Electronics". Almost all of the readers of electronics magazines were male. A Ziff-Davis survey in 1981 showed that 97% of the readers were male. In April 1972 the cover did not have the tag line and there was a letter to the editors from a female reader titled "Women With Ideas In Electronics." The editors asked readers to write in on what would be an appropriate tag line. The "For Men With Ideas In Electronics" returned the next month and stayed until March 1974 when the tag line was changed to "The Magazine with New Ideas in Electronics." In one last affront to the feminist movement, the June 1974 cover of Radio-Electronics has a young lady in a bikini by a swimming pool with that month's feature project, a guitar amplifier.

Around 1971, many authors who used to contribute to Popular Electronics started writing for Radio-Electronics. There was some competition in digital logic projects between Radio-Electronics and Popular Electronics. In September 1973, Radio-Electronics published Don Lancaster's "TV Typewriter" and in July 1974 it published Jon Titus's "Mark-8 Personal Minicomputer". However, Popular Electronics published the most famous project in January 1975 with the MITS Altair 8800 computer.

After Popular Electronics went under after attempting to become a computer magazine in the early 1980s, Radio-Electronics published many eye-catching feature projects like a series on cable TV descramblers. Some projects were designed by kit manufacturers like PAiA Electronics, North Country Radio, Information Unlimited, Almost All Digital Electronics, and Ramsey Electronics.

== See also ==
- List of projects published in Radio-Electronics magazine
