= SR International – Radio Sweden =

International broadcasting station of Sweden

Coordinates: 59°20′5″N 18°6′5″E

Sveriges Radio International
- Type: Radio network
- Country: Sweden

Ownership
- Owner: Sveriges Radio
- Key people: Ingemar Löfgren (Head of SR International); Gundula Adolfsson (Program Director); Nidia Hagström (News Director); Gaby Katz (Head of English Service)

History
- Launch date: 1938; 87 years ago
- Former names: Radio Sweden International

Coverage
- Availability: International

Links
- Website: http://radiosweden.org/

Radio Sweden (Swedish: Sveriges Radio International) is Sweden's official international broadcasting station. It is a non-commercial and politically independent public service broadcasting company.

== History ==
SR International is part of Sveriges Radio (SR), Sweden's non-commercial public-radio broadcasting organization. The service was founded in 1938, at the approach of World War II, as a way of keeping Swedes living abroad informed of happenings in Sweden and of Swedish opinion. Programming was at first in Swedish only, but in 1939 English- and German-language broadcasts were added.

After the war, further language services were added: in French, Portuguese, Russian, and Spanish. At the close of the Cold War, the services in French, Portuguese, and Spanish were gradually phased out and replaced by new services in Estonian and Latvian. The latter services were withdrawn once Estonia and Latvia had developed their own independent media and joined the European Union.

Radio Sweden also operated a service in Belarusian between 2004 and 2009.

In the 1990s Radio Sweden was merged with SR's Immigrant Languages Department to form the SR International channel. For a while, immigrant language services, such as those in Arabic and Kurdish, were additionally carried on shortwave.

== Programming in other languages ==
The Radio Sweden English Service seeks to provide a window on the diverse perspectives and issues in Sweden today.

Its programs and website offer a ”smörgåsbord” of news and current affairs, science and technology, lifestyle, and culture.

In the beginning of 2016, the international service underwent a major reorganization. English language news about Sweden for overseas listeners were moved to a 30 minutes-a-week show on P2 and to social media. Minority languages service was further focused on those minorities living in Sweden and integrated with Swedish language services.

Service in languages of the oppressed nations, such as Somali, were moved to an independent organization. News for overseas listeners in foreign languages other than English, such as Russian and German, has been canceled. There have been several foreign-languages services in the history of Radio Sweden. The German Program was discontinued after 76 years of service.

== Former programs ==
=== Sweden Calling DXers ===
One of the most popular programs on Radio Sweden was Sweden Calling DXers, founded in 1948 by Arne Skoog. He reasoned that shortwave listening or DXing was a very young hobby, and that by providing information in a weekly program for shortwave listeners about their hobby, Radio Sweden was teaching its own audience about how to listen better. While the first program was based solely on Arne's own listening, listeners were encouraged to write in with their own news, and soon virtually all of the program was based on listener's letters (an early example of interactivity).

The program was carried on Tuesdays in all of Radio Sweden's services except Swedish.

When Arne Skoog retired in connection with the program's 30th anniversary in 1978, the program was taken over by George Wood, a member of the Radio Sweden English Service. After a number of years, as media changed, it began to cover less about shortwave, and more about satellite radio and television. Later coverage was extended to the Internet, the focus was shifted to concentrating on Swedish media, and the name of the English version of the program was changed to "MediaScan". "MediaScan" was the first English-language radio program in Europe (and the second overall in Europe) to post audio on the Internet (on the ftp sites ftp.funet.fi and ftp.sunet.se, as well as via Internet Multicasting).

In 2001 the program was discontinued, but remains in a somewhat sporadic form on the Radio Sweden website.

=== The Saturday Show ===
Another popular Radio Sweden program was The Saturday Show, with Roger Wallis and Kim Loughran, which ran from 1967 to 1981. The program was launched to showcase Swedish rock and pop music in a world dominated by American and British rock. Using Radio Sweden's relatively high-powered medium wave transmitter on 1179 kHz, the entire program was 90 minutes in length, and featured many satirical sketches, often political and sometimes controversial. A 30-minute segment of the entire broadcast was the Radio Sweden shortwave program on Saturdays.

== End of radio broadcasting ==
On October 20, 2010, Radio Sweden ceased broadcasts on shortwave and medium wave, as Swedish Radio's management decided that the Internet had matured enough to support international broadcasts. At the same time the English Service was extended to national broadcasts on FM, but programming on weekends was discontinued. Services in English also continue on satellite, both using Sveriges Television's satellite and the World Radio Network.

== See also ==
- Sveriges Radio, the Swedish publicly funded radio broadcaster
