= Sweden Calling DXers =

Program on Radio Sweden

Sweden Calling DXers was a radio program on Radio Sweden, founded in 1948 by Arne Skoog. He reasoned that shortwave listening or DXing was a very young hobby, and that by providing information in a weekly program for shortwave listeners about their hobby, Radio Sweden was teaching its own audience about how to listen better. While the first program was based solely on Arne's own listening, listeners were encouraged to write in with their own news, and soon virtually all of the program was based on listener's letters (an early example of interactivity).

The program was aired on Tuesdays in all of Radio Sweden's services (i.e. languages) except Swedish.

== After Arne Skoog ==
When Arne Skoog retired in connection with the program's 30th anniversary in 1978, the program was taken over by George Wood, a member of the Radio Sweden English Service. After a number of years, as media changed, it began to cover less about shortwave, and more about satellite radio and television. Later coverage was extended to the Internet, the focus was shifted to concentrating on Swedish media, and the name of the English version of the program was changed to "MediaScan". "MediaScan" was the first English language radio program in Europe (and the second overall in Europe) to post audio on the Internet (on the ftp sites ftp.funet.fi and ftp.sunet.se, as well as via Internet Multicasting), starting in 1994.

The last radio broadcast of MediaScan was on July 17, 2001. The original Sweden Calling DXers bulletins were replaced by the MediaScan Online Edition, which remains in a somewhat sporadic form on the Radio Sweden website.
