= World War II Radio Heroes =

World War II Radio Heroes: Letters of Compassion
- Author: Lisa Spahr with Austin Camacho
- Cover artist: Dave Williams
- Language: English
- Genre: Non-fiction
- Published: 2007 (Intrigue Publishing)
- Publication place: United States
- Media type: Print (paperback)
- Pages: 76 pp
- ISBN: 978-0-9762181-7-3

World War II Radio Heroes: Letters of Compassion is a book by psychologist Lisa Spahr, co-authored with Austin Camacho, that recounts her personal investigation of the activities of shortwave radio listeners who notified families of captured U.S. military personnel of their status as prisoners of war during World War II. It documents Spahr's search to locate and thank the listeners who wrote letters to her great-grandmother reporting details of her grandfather's capture and internment in a German prison camp in 1943.

== Discovery ==
Spahr's discovery of what she first took to be a box of love letters in trunk belonging to her late grandfather inspired her to investigate who wrote them and why. She found more than 70 letters written to her great-grandmother Martha in 1943 by individuals in different parts of U.S. Each one advised Martha that her son Robert had been captured during the Tunisia Campaign and was being held by the Germans as a prisoner of war. The letters often included personal reassurances from the writer, such as "don't worry" and "he's in good health", and some passed along requests for items from home, such as toothbrushes and underwear. Subsequent investigation showed they were written by shortwave radio listeners who'd tuned in to Axis propaganda broadcasts that disseminated details of recently captured prisoners. Inspired by the apparent compassion of the writers and the unique service they felt compelled to provide to families of war prisoners, she undertook to try to locate and thank any she could find who were still living. An internet search of names and addresses contained on the letters resulted in a number of possible leads. Spahr sent letters of gratitude to approximately 75 of these and received about a dozen responses. She was able to make subsequent contact with several of the individuals, and developed close friendships with a few of them.

== Listeners ==
During World War II, short messages from prisoners of war were often read by studio announcers at stations in Germany, Japan, and other Axis powers countries. A number of shortwave listeners copied the prisoner names and addresses and notified families by mail or telephone, and the practice became known as “Prisoner of War relay” or “POW monitoring". Although the Allied government provided similar services, the families usually heard from shortwave listeners first, sometimes as many as 100 at a time.

Many wartime listeners were ordinary citizens who discovered they were able access the shortwave bands; a feature included on many premium consumer radios of the era. Times and radio frequencies of the news from Rome, Berlin and Tokyo were published daily on the radio page of The New York Times. Others were dedicated shortwave listeners or DXers who maintained an ongoing interest in long-distance radio listening as a hobby. Still others were licensed amateur radio operators who were, as a group, banned from transmitting due to wartime restrictions, but often kept their listening gear in operation.

Some of the reports they provided were casual. Spahr documents a letter from Edward D. Rapier of New Orleans, Louisiana who wrote that he accidentally tuned into a German broadcast and heard about Robert Spahr’s status. Others appeared more urgent. Mrs. Earl Seigle of Tyler, Texas sent a letter to Martha Spahr by airmail special delivery. Seigle noted the radio announcer's reading of a message from Robert Spahr: “I arrived safe in Germany as a prisoner. I will write later.” Others like Irwin F. Bender of Oberlin, Pennsylvania asked for the donation of a postage stamp so that he might continue to provide other families the same service. Sometimes letters got misrouted, and Martha Spahr once received news of a soldier named James C. Caraway. Many listeners like Herman Winkler of New York City were so dedicated to their practice they created letter templates to speed up the process.

Flavius Jankauskas, age 16, with his shortwave receiver in 1942.

Some of these belonged to clubs such as “SWAM”, the Short-Wave Amateur Monitors Club, a group of listeners organized by Mrs. Ruby Yant of Lima, Ohio. Yant assigned each member a specific night of the week to monitor so that no messages would be missed. A copy of a SWAM newsletter containing a membership list, and a SWAM postcard invitation to membership, both reproduced in the book, indicate that the group was formed in 1943 and had around 50 members in 1944. Some of the SWAM monitors approached their job with enthusiasm. Although not typical, at least two SWAM members were responsible for sending 3,000 letters each. Another, according to Spahr, sent over 5,000.

One SWAM member, Flavius Jankauskas of Philadelphia, Pennsylvania was only 16 years old when he sent his letter to Spahr's family. The next year he joined the war effort by enlisting in the United States Merchant Marine. On meeting Jankauskas, Spahr reports that he remains a ham radio enthusiast holding the callsign K3JA, and still listens to shortwave broadcasts as a hobby. They developed a close friendship, culminating with Jankauskas presenting Spahr with the shortwave radio receiver he used during the war as a gift.

== Controversy ==
The practice of monitoring POW broadcasts sometimes provoked the U.S. government to react strongly against individual listeners. Spahr documents a number of cases, among them, John R. Fike, of Omaha, Nebraska. Fike sent a letter to Martha Spahr on May 9, 1943. Shortly after, the FBI investigated Fike's shortwave radio listening and accused him of being a German spy. His name was eventually cleared before his death in 1988. Listening to enemy broadcasters was widely viewed with suspicion by the government, and Spahr cites a 1943 American Legion Magazine article which sought to discourage reliance on news contained in enemy broadcasts, saying that the POW broadcasts were seen as merely bait in the Axis propaganda war, intended to weaken the morale and the “will to fight” of relatives and friends of missing men.

By 1943, government officials were reportedly “increasingly concerned” over citizen POW monitoring. A New York Times article stated the activity was “playing directly into the hands of the country’s enemies” by building up an audience for the propaganda broadcasts. It went on to say that since there was no assurance of the information’s accuracy, the shortwave listeners might cause "needless disappointment and heartache.” The American Red Cross reported that hundreds of families had received “false casualty reports,” and that enemy news of prisoners should be ignored. It quoted the FBI as saying “The spreading of such reports indicated a substantial force of enemy representatives strategically placed throughout the country, working under enemy orders to undermine American morale.”
