= Henk Bos =

Henk Bos may refer to:

- Henk Bos (painter) (1901–1979), Dutch painter
- Henk J. M. Bos (1940–2024), Dutch historian of mathematics
- Henk Bos (footballer) (born 1992), Dutch footballer
- Henk Bos (speedway rider), see 2010 Individual Speedway European Championship
