= The Saturday Show =

The Saturday Show can refer to:

== Radio ==
- The Saturday Show (Radio Sweden), a program broadcast on Radio Sweden 1967–1981
- The Saturday Show (Amazing Radio), a weekly radio show broadcast every Saturday from 9 am to noon, beginning in 2010

== Television ==
- The Saturday Show (BBC TV series), a BBC TV children's series broadcast from 2001–2005
- The Saturday Show (TSW TV series) (later "Freeze Frame"), an early-1980s children's show broadcast by ITV franchisee TSW (not related to the networked ITV show broadcast around the same time)
- The Saturday Show (Australian TV series), a 1959 television series aired on ABV-2.
- The Saturday Show (Channel 5 TV series), a magazine programme broadcast by Channel 5 from 2015
