= Radio Netherlands Worldwide =

Public international Dutch radio and television network

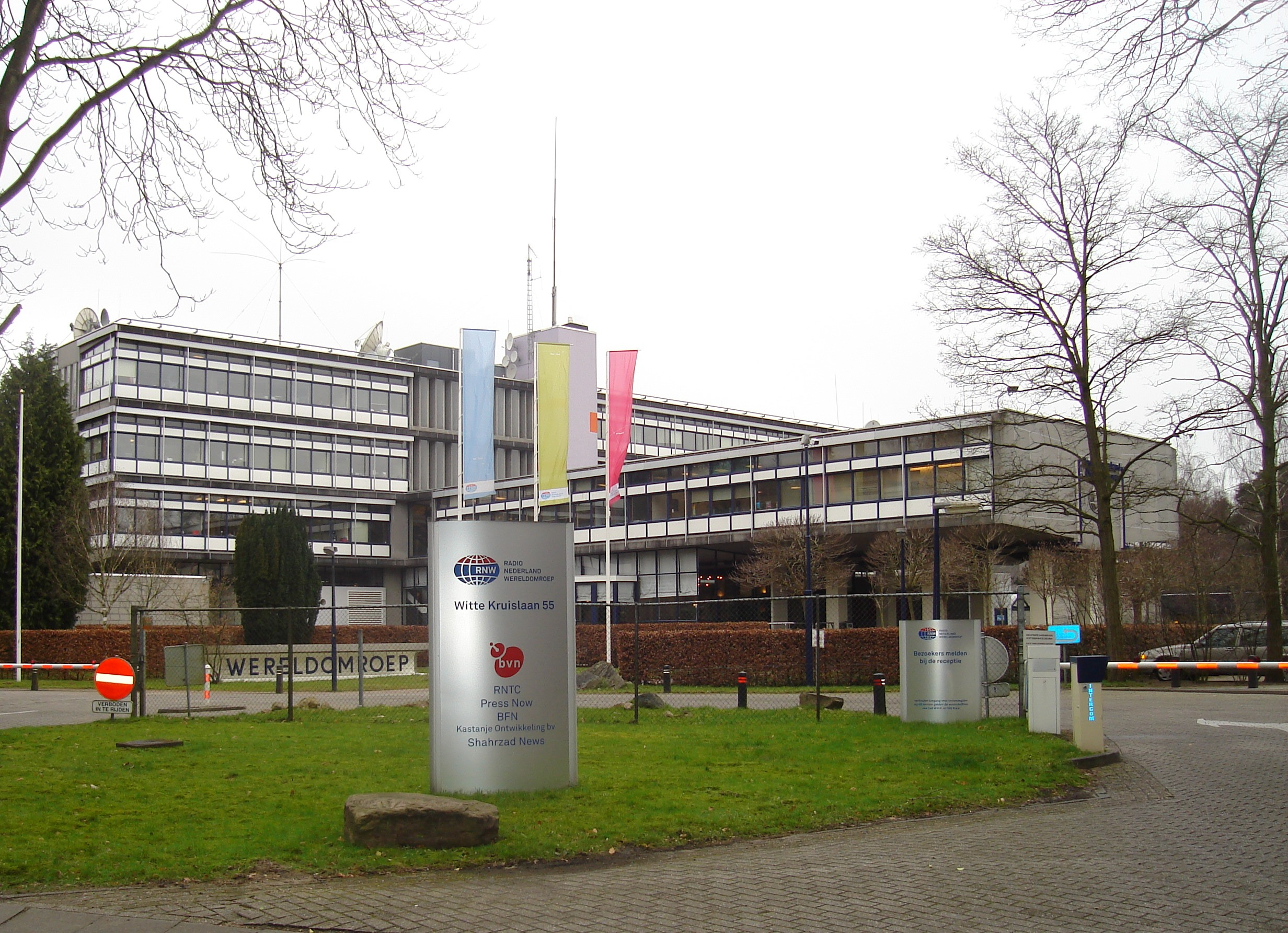
- Type: International public broadcaster
- Country: Netherlands
- Availability: International
- Launch date: 15 April 1947
- Dissolved: 31 December 2012
- Official website: Radio Netherlands Archives
- Replaced: PCJ/PHI (Philips Radio)
- Replaced by: RNW Media

Radio Netherlands (RNW; Dutch: Radio Nederland Wereldomroep) was a public radio and television network based in Hilversum, producing and transmitting programmes for international audiences outside the Netherlands from 1947 to 2012.

Its services in Dutch ended on 11 May 2012. English and Indonesian language services ceased on 29 June 2012 due to steep budget cuts imposed by the Dutch government and a concomitant change in focus. The last programme broadcast on shortwave was a daily half-hour show in Spanish for Cuba named El Toque (The Touch) on 1 August 2014.

Radio Netherlands Worldwide was replaced by RNW Media, a Dutch non-profit promoting free speech and social change internationally.

== History ==
=== Early days (Philips Radio) ===
Following a series of experiments on various wavelengths in 1925, reports of good reception from a low-power shortwave transmitter were received from Jakarta on 11 March 1927. Dutch Queen Wilhelmina made what is believed to be the world's first royal broadcast on 1 June 1927, addressing compatriots in the East and West Indies.

Regular international broadcast transmissions started shortly afterwards from the Philips shortwave transmitter in Eindhoven. They used the call sign PHOHI for broadcasts in the Dutch language to the Dutch East Indies (now Indonesia), and PCJJ for broadcasts in English and other languages to the rest of the world.

The Philips company in Eindhoven saw a market for its radios in the Dutch colonies. Its research laboratories received support from companies that were trading goods between The Netherlands and Batavia (now Indonesia). The PHOHI was officially founded on 18 June 1927. In 1928, test transmissions commenced from a site in Huizen, North Holland. It was chosen because of the high water table on the land near the Zuiderzee lake (now Gooimeer). This meant there was a good conductivity for an efficient earth, which led to stronger signals in the target areas.

Around 1929, the Philips call sign was simplified to PCJ.

There were several prewar technical innovations:

The Research Laboratories continued with the development of new transmitters that could operate at shorter wavelengths and could be re-tuned for broadcasts to different parts of the world. By the end of 1936, the power had been raised by connecting a stage with two water-cooled type TA 20/250 valves. This provided a power output of 60 kW on a frequency of 15.22 MHz and immediately became the strongest short-wave transmitter in Europe. In 1937, this transmitter was moved from Eindhoven to the PHOHI Transmitter Park in Huizen.

- Broadcasts were considerably improved in 1937 with the construction of beam antennas supported by the world's first wooden antenna masts rotatable on two concentric circular rails at the transmitter site in Huizen. In November 2006, a 1/5th size model of this antenna was officially inaugurated on a roundabout a few hundred metres from the original site.
- Rotatable curtain array antennas were not in common use until the 1960s, so PCJ was far ahead of its time with its introduction of rotatable HRS type antennas.

=== Dutch broadcasting in exile ===
Broadcasts from the Netherlands were interrupted by the German invasion in May 1940. There were three transmitters in operation at that time. On the afternoon of May 14, the Dutch military commander gave orders that the transmitters should be destroyed, to prevent them falling into the hands of the Nazis. After several attempts, which included calling in the help of the Hilversum fire brigade, two of the three transmitters were completely destroyed. The third was only partially damaged and was later repaired and used by the Germans for pro-Nazi broadcasts, some originating from Germany. There were also relays of music concerts from Dutch broadcasters operating under German control.

The Dutch government-in-exile was granted air-time on BBC transmitters in 1941. The programme Radio Oranje was a daily commentary on the Dutch situation both in the Netherlands and the rest of the empire (Dutch East and West Indies). The director and chief commentator on Radio Oranje, Hendrik van den Broek, was given the task of restarting public broadcasting once the country was liberated.

On 3 October 1944, van den Broek travelled from London to a liberated Eindhoven and began broadcasts as Radio Herrijzend Nederland (Radio Netherlands Resurgent).

=== Birth of Radio Netherlands Worldwide ===
On 24 May 1945, a programme for Dutch people living abroad was transmitted with the help of the BBC. In July 1945, the Dutch government founded the Stichting Radio Nederland in den Overgangstijd (Radio Netherlands in Time of Transition) and gave it the mandate for both domestic and international broadcasts.

Later, under pressure from the pre-war Dutch broadcasting companies, the government decided to separate national and international broadcasting. On 15 April 1947, the Stichting Radio Nederland Wereldomroep (Radio Netherlands International Foundation) was established. Broadcasts in Dutch, Indonesian, English and Spanish began in that year. Subsequently, language services in Arabic and Afrikaans (1949), French (1969) and Brazilian Portuguese (1974) were added.

Radio Netherlands was editorially independent and received 6% of the Dutch annual public allocation for public broadcasting.

The interval signal of Radio Netherlands was a version of the Eighty Years' War song Merck toch hoe sterck played on a carillon. The original recording was made at the cathedral in Den Bosch. It was replaced in August 1987 by a recording of the carillon in Breda.

=== End of radio broadcasts ===
The English-language shortwave broadcasts to North America were discontinued on 26 October 2008, due to a survey that claimed that more listeners listened to RNW podcasts than listened on shortwave radio.

On 24 June 2011, the Dutch government announced a 70% cut to RNW's budget reducing it from 46 million euros to 14 million.

On 11 May 2012 at 20:00 GMT (22:00 CEST), the Dutch service signed off at the end of a 24-hour radio marathon broadcast. This included several interviews with past staff members of the station, including the former Director General Lodewijk Bouwens. On 29 June 2012, Radio Netherlands ended broadcasting in English at 20:57 GMT (22:57 CEST) after a similar celebratory 24-hour broadcast. The final show was posted online by Jonathan Marks, the former Radio Netherlands Programme Director (1992–2003) and host of Media Network.

Since 2013, RNW's funding had been under the responsibility of the Dutch Foreign Ministry rather than the Education and Culture Ministry.

== Shortwave relay stations ==
The shortwave international broadcasts were heard worldwide via broadcast facilities in Bonaire (opened in 1969) and Madagascar (opened in 1972). The last transmission from the shortwave relay station in Bonaire ended at 1:57 GMT on June 30, 2012, and the installations were dismantled later that year.

In 2013, the government of Madagascar and Malagasy Global Business S.A. signed an agreement to operate the Madagascar relay station in Talata-Volonondry. Among its customers are NHK Radio Japan, BBC World Service, Deutsche Welle, Vatican Radio, Adventist World Radio and Free Press Unlimited.

Radio Netherlands Worldwide used a shortwave station in Flevoland from 1985 to 2007. The shortwave transmissions were supplemented by an extensive network of partner stations.

== Languages ==
Language	Date of launch	Date of closure
Afrikaans	1949	?
Arabic	1949	2012
Brazilian Portuguese	1974	1994
Dutch	15 April 1947	11 May 2012
English	15 April 1947	29 June 2012
French	1969	?
Indonesian	15 April 1947	29 June 2012
Spanish	15 April 1947	1 August 2014

== Programming on the English Service ==
The English-language output included news and current affairs, as well as documentaries and programmes about the Netherlands, Europe, culture, music, the media and international affairs. The station developed a reputation for providing unique, objective and high-quality public radio, garnering dozens of international awards for its productions. When the station closed down, the extensive English-language multi-media archives were deleted, but a group of former employees has made over a thousand of documentaries and radio programmes available again.

DX Juke Box was a media show that ran from 1961 with Harry van Gelder (1911–2003) and Jim Vastenhoud through to 7 May 1981, when the name and format was changed to Media Network. Jonathan Marks took over in August 1980 and re-launched the show less than one year later by adding news/topical features. He produced over 1000 editions of the programme. It became a full-time website/weblog in October 2000. The blog was discontinued in 2012 as a result of budget cuts. The Media Network archive containing around 300 of the broadcasts is available online.

Happy Station Show was another long-running popular radio show, originating on the PCJJ in 1928 and continued until 1995. The show was presented by Eddy Startz from 1928 until 1969 and by Tom Meijer (Tom Meyer) from 1970 until 1993.

From 1976 until his death in 1998, Pete Myers was a prominent presenter and producer in the English section, including as a presenter of Happy Station from early 1993 until late 1994.

== See also ==
- List of radio stations in the Netherlands
