= Happy Station =

Happy Station may refer to:

- Happy Station Show, an international radio show 1928–2020
- "Happy Station", a 1983 single by Fun Fun
