= Arne Skoog =

Arne Skoog was born in 1913 in the northern Swedish province of Jämtland. He died on 7 June 1999 aged 86.

== Sweden Calling DXers ==
In 1948, Arne, then a young engineer at Radio Sweden, founded Sweden Calling DXers as a way of keeping listeners in touch with news in the world of international radio. Shortwave came into its own during the Second World War, and after the war shortwave listening became a popular hobby. But hobbyists needed access to the latest news, and Arne felt the best place for them to find out was on a shortwave station.

Many hobbyists say they remember Arne presenting Sweden Calling DXers, which is curious since he never did. Arne wrote the scripts, which were read by colleagues, first by the English Service, and then in all of Radio Sweden's languages, except, ironically, Swedish.

Initially Arne gathered all his own news for the program, but soon listeners were writing in with material for the program. Almost immediately a written version of the program scripts was being mailed out to everyone who contributed. At its height there were between 1500 and 2000 names on the list, and they constituted a ”Who’s Who” of the shortwave community.

When Arne retired in 1978, on the program's 30th anniversary, George Wood, who wasn't even born in 1948, took over. But changing times and new Radio Sweden management led to radical changes with the introduction of satellite broadcasting in the 1980s.

The mailing list was discontinued, and the program became a twice a month English-only program called MediaScan, which concentrated more and more on satellite DXing and general Scandinavian media news. The radio program was completely discontinued in 2001, and continues as a sporadically updated page on the Radio Sweden website.

== Arne and the DX Community ==
Arne Skoog was also one of the founders of the Swedish DX Federation, and later the European DX Council. He rejected, however, the sometimes expressed claim that he was ”the father of all Swedish DXers”.

In his retirement, Arne turned to his second pastime, violin-making, for which he was quite respected. He taught many courses in the skill. He died on June 7, 1999, in his beloved home province of Jämtland.
