= George Wood (Radio Sweden) =

American journalist

George MacClaren Wood III is an American journalist who has worked at Radio Sweden since 1975, He was born in Berkeley, California on August 10, 1949, and grew up in Piedmont, California. He has degrees from the University of California, Santa Barbara and the University of California, Berkeley, and participated in the university's Education Abroad Program to Lund University in Sweden, 1969-1970.

== Radio Sweden ==
George Wood began as a freelance reporter at Radio Sweden in 1975. Following the retirement of Arne Skoog in 1978 he took over the writing and presenting of the program Sweden Calling DXers and its successor MediaScan, until the latter was taken off the air in 2001. In 1994 MediaScan became the first radio program in Sweden and the second in Europe (the first in English) to have its audio posted on the Internet.

He was Radio Sweden's Webmaster since Swedish Radio's first website launched in 1995, while also serving as a journalist for the Radio Swedish English Service. His was one of the voices in the satirical sketches in the program the Saturday Show. He retired from Radio Sweden in August, 2014.

== Egyptology ==
After retirement George Wood enrolled in Egyptology courses at Uppsala University.

== Other activities ==
George Wood was News Director of the university radio station KCSB-FM (at the University of California, Santa Barbara) in 1971-1973, and has also worked at KPFA in Berkeley, California, Earth News Service in San Francisco, and briefly as a freelancer for National Public Radio. Since the late 70's he has been the Stockholm stringer for CBS Radio News. He has written articles for a number of publications including "Satellite Times", "The World Radio TV Handbook", and the "New Age Journal".
