= British DX Club =

Amateur radio association

The British DX Club (abbreviated to BDXC or BDXC-UK) is an association of radio hobbyists and enthusiasts, based in the United Kingdom. It caters for DXers and others with an interest in listening to the short wave, medium wave (AM), long wave and FM radio bands, and studying current and historical topics relating to radio broadcasting.

It was founded in 1974 as the Twickenham DX Club (after the London suburb where it was based), adopting the current name in 1979 to reflect what had become a national membership. As of late 2018, it had almost 500 members in the UK and abroad.

== Publications ==
BDXC's main activity is the publication of the monthly magazine Communication, which is registered with the British Library (ISSN 0958-2142). The magazine is edited by volunteers and its contents are based on contributions from club members. A typical edition of Communication includes news of broadcasting developments in the UK and around the world; station "loggings" on various wavebands; radio station transmitting schedules and programmes; and letters and articles of general interest on broadcasting topics.

Broadcasts in English is a twice-yearly guide to all known international broadcasts in English on short wave and medium wave, as well as selected domestic English-language broadcasts on short wave.

Radio Stations in the United Kingdom & Ireland (now in its 27th edition) has been published regularly since 1978.

== Other services and activities ==
BDXC has a Groups.io account to allow club members to share news and tips on DX "catches".

The club's website (which may be accessed without a subscription) has a variety of resources to support DXers, including comprehensive guides to broadcasting in many parts of the world and many articles on different aspects of the hobby.

BDXC Audio Circle (formerly known as BDXC Tape Circle) is an audio magazine, available to members as a free download.

The club supports meetings for members and other enthusiasts to share their interest in radio. It maintains friendly relations with other clubs for radio hobbyists and is a member of the European DX Council (EDXC). In 2016, the EDXC's annual conference was hosted by the BDXC in Manchester.

BDXC and its members are important contributors to each edition of the World Radio Television Handbook (WRTH), an annual publication listing broadcasting times and frequencies of most of the world's national and international broadcasters. Information on other UK DX clubs is also included in WRTH.
