= Roger Wallis =

British-Swedish journalist (1941–2022)

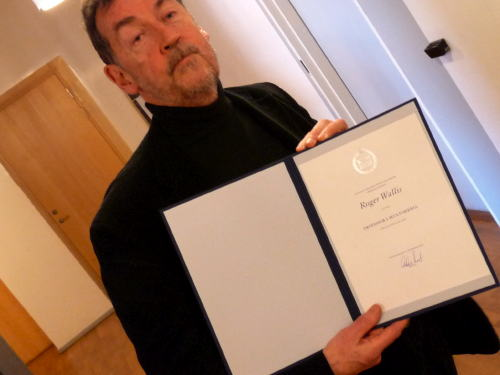
- Wallis at the Pirate Bay trial in 2009

Background information
- Born: 8 August 1941; Rugby, England
- Died: 22 January 2022 (aged 80); Stockholm, Sweden
- Occupations: Musician; journalist; researcher

Roger Wallis (8 August 1941 – 22 January 2022) was a British-born Swedish musician, journalist and researcher.

== Life and career ==
Wallis was a resident of Sweden from 1963, and was an adjunct professor of multimedia at the Royal Institute of Technology in Stockholm.

Between 1967 and 1981, Wallis was the main presenter of the English language The Saturday Show on Radio Sweden. Wallis also co-wrote "Judy, min vän", the Swedish contribution for the Eurovision Song Contest 1969.

He wrote several books on the music industry with Krister Malm. Wallis was appointed to the board of STIM. He testified in the Pirate Bay trial in February 2009. Wallis died on 22 January 2022, at the age of 80.
