= Pete Myers (radio broadcaster) =

Radio broadcaster (1939–1998)

- Born: 18 April 1939; Bangalore. India
- Died: 5 December 1998 (aged 59); Utrecht, The Netherlands
- Occupation: International radio broadcaster
- Notable credit(s): Ghana Broadcasting Corporation; BBC World Service; Radio Netherlands Worldwide

Pete Myers (18 April 1939 – 5 December 1998) was an international broadcaster with the BBC World Service and Radio Netherlands Worldwide.

== Biography ==
Myers was born to Anglo-Indian parents in Bangalore. His father worked for Indian Railways. His career in radio started in Ghana, where he arrived as a teenager in 1957, three days before independence. Myers became friends with Smokey Hesse, who hosted Jazz Scene on Radio Ghana and let Myers regularly sit in during broadcasts. One day, Smokey realised he had forgotten his script at home, rushed back to get it, and was hit by a bus and killed. Sitting in the studio, and unaware of the accident, Myers was asked to fill in and present the programme instead. He did it so well that he was hired as a broadcaster at the station. He became the Ghana Broadcasting Corporation's top radio personality and the favourite radio voice of Ghana's first president, Kwame Nkrumah.

While in Accra, Myers organized a weekly discotheque session that helped popularize rock and roll in the capital and also directed the country's first musical and helped found what became the country's national theatre. During the Congo Crisis, he and friends went to Katanga to entertain United Nations peacekeepers in the Congo. Later, Myers was part of a troupe, which included an orchestra and 85 dancers, that was sent to Moscow to perform.

On the strength of his success at Radio Ghana, Myers was hired in 1963 by the BBC External Service (renamed the BBC World Service in 1965) as the first host of Good Morning Africa for the BBC African Service. On the programme, he "anarchically scattered jokes, competitions and fictional guests like the American Vietnam commander 'General Wastemoreland' between the 'pop, politics and personalities' of the programme's sub-title." Myers's success brought him celebrity in Africa, with fans gathering in the thousands to greet him at airports.

Myers was in the cohort of DJs who launched BBC Radio 1 in 1967 sharing duties with Terry Wogan presenting Late Night Extra, while also continuing on the BBC Africa Service. He was constrained on his Radio 1 show by the station's restrictive playlist and policies, denying him the on-air freedom he had on the World Service. He also began presenting a weekend programme on BBC Africa, PM, named after his initials, on which he would interview celebrities, including Shirley Bassey, Carol Channing, David Lean, Stephen Sondheim, Ingrid Bergman and Sophia Loren. In the early 1970s, the success of Good Morning Africa led the World Service to make it the flagship morning programme across the English section as The Good Morning Show, which also was presented by Myers.

He left the BBC in 1974, after 11 years, and moved to Beirut, Lebanon, where he opened a nightclub called the Crazy Horse Saloon, only to close it down a few weeks later when the Lebanese Civil War broke out. He moved to Turkey, where he attempted to start another nightclub, before returning to broadcasting in 1976 when he joined Radio Netherlands, where he produced and presented English-language documentaries, features, and other programming aimed at Africa and Asia, as well as for the English section generally, presenting and producing programmes such as Afroscene, Mainstream Asia, Asiascan, Rembrandt Express, and 50+. From 1993 to 1994, he hosted Radio Netherlands' venerable Happy Station Show.

In 1968, in London, he married American folk singer Hedy West in a marriage of convenience in order to allow West to remain in the UK. West and Myers later divorced.

Myers died, aged 59, of cancer and complications from AIDS.
