= RNW Media =

Dutch public multimedia non-governmental organisation

- Stichting RNW Media
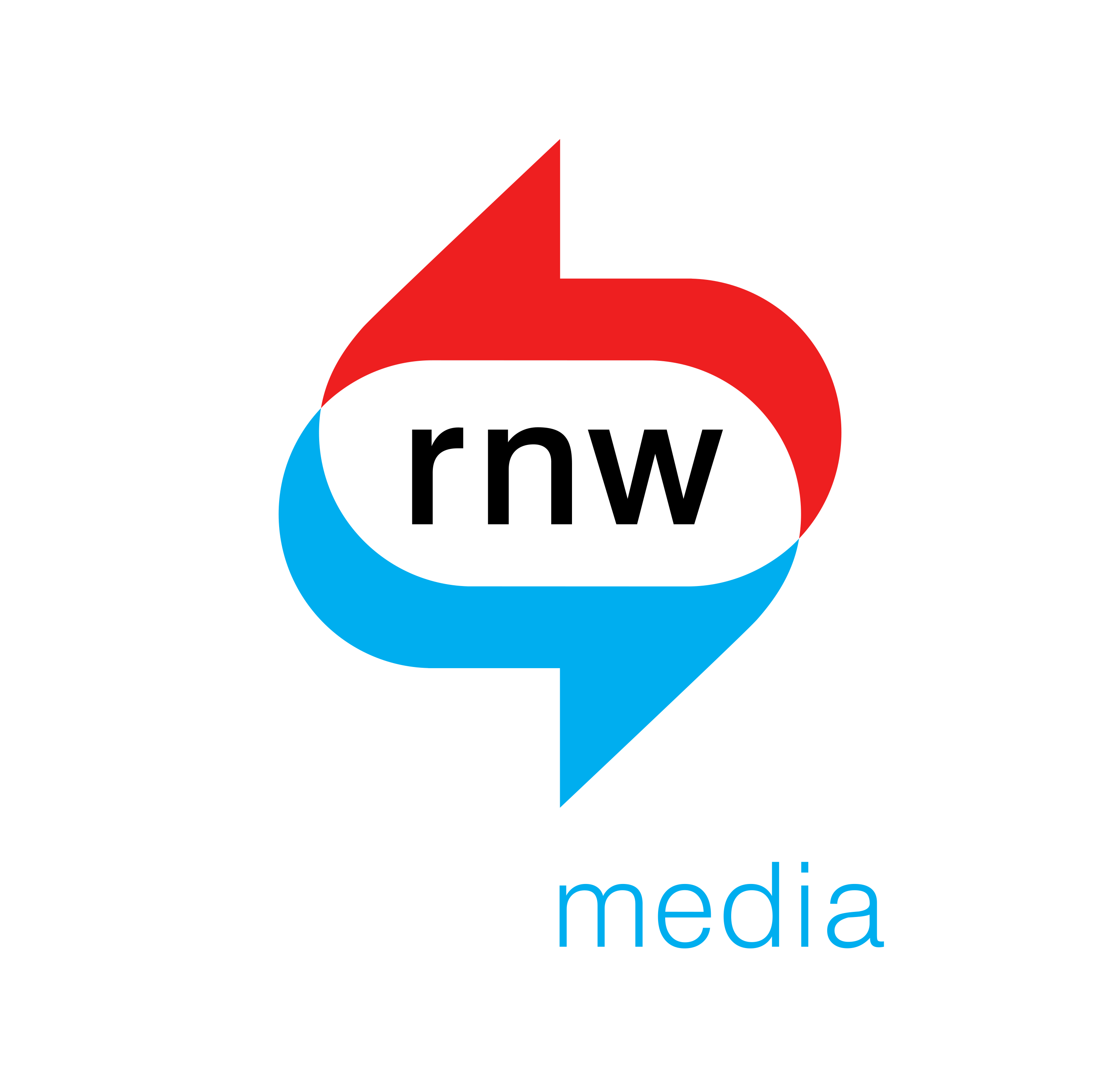
- Formation: 1 January 2013; 13 years ago

RNW Media (formerly known as Radio Nederland Wereldomroep) is an international non-governmental organisation based in Hilversum, the Netherlands.

== History ==
From 1947 to 2012, RNW Media was known as Radio Netherlands Worldwide or RNW (Dutch: Radio Nederland Wereldomroep), the Dutch international public broadcaster, and it was funded by the Netherlands Ministry of Education, Culture and Science. In 2013, RNW Media was restructured and became a media NGO for free speech with funding from the Dutch Ministry of Foreign Affairs. The free speech organisational programme ended in 2016. That year, RNW Media developed a new strategy – “Enabling the Next Generation: Young people, media and social change” – and a corresponding organisational programme.

== Locations ==
RNW Media operates in 13 countries: Burundi, the Democratic Republic of Congo (DRC), Kenya, Mali, Nigeria and Uganda in Africa; Egypt, Libya, Syria and Yemen in the Middle East and North Africa; China in Asia. Through the social franchise-based Love Matters Global Network, RNW Media is also active in India and Mexico via the respective host organisations: Development Consortium and México Vivo.

== Funding ==
RNW Media's main funder is currently the Dutch Foreign Ministry. It also receives funding from AmplifyChange, EuropeAid, the Dutch Nationale Postcode Loterij, the Swedish Postcode Foundation and Nuffic.

== Governance ==
RNW Media is led by a CEO, Jacqueline Lampe, and she is overseen by a supervisory board (Raad van Toezicht).

== Supervisory Board ==
RNW Media is governed by a supervisory board which is responsible for overseeing the policy of the CEO and the general running of the organisation.

== Personnel ==
RNW Media employs a core staff in the Netherlands who are responsible for strategic planning, programme management, communications, branding and stakeholder management, business development and data and digital processes. They manage, coordinate and support the local teams and partners based in the target countries who are responsible for programme implementation. On 1 January 2019, RNW Media had 160 staff members, 55 of whom were based in the Netherlands and 105 in the target countries.

== Activities ==
=== Social cohesion and inclusive governance ===
‘Citizens’ Voice’ is RNW Media's programme designed to strengthen social cohesion and inclusive governance so young people can be meaningful participants and leaders in their communities. Citizens’ Voice creates digital communities where young people can come together to voice opinions, discuss sensitive subjects, engage in constructive dialogue and imagine the kind of society they want to live in. Local networks of journalists, bloggers and change-makers from across the political and social spectrum run the Citizens’ Voice platforms and use modern media strategies to spark and moderate discussions and foster diversity of opinion. Currently Citizen's Voice is active in Yemen, Libya, Burundi, Democratic Republic of Congo, Mali, China and Egypt.

=== Sexual and reproductive health and rights ===
‘Love Matters’ is RNW Media's SRHR programme. It is a global digital community supporting safe, healthy and pleasurable love, sex and relationships for young people. Love Matters uses a social franchise model to ensure sustainability of impact and provides online educational platforms that deliver accessible evidence- and right-based information and advice to young people. The programme also creates online spaces for visitors to share their thoughts and ask questions to experts. Currently, Love Matters is active in China, India, Kenya, DRC, Nigeria, Egypt and Mexico.

=== Media training ===
RNW Media's training centre, RNTC, celebrated its 50th anniversary in 2018 and has become a centre of expertise for media and communications professionals around the world, especially for those working in fragile states or countries in transition. RNTC offers a mix of long and short courses— from Media campaigns for Development and Social Change to Producing Media to Counter Radicalisation. Other themes include Data Visualisation and Digital Thinking. RNTC also offers tailor-made and pop-up trainings for universities, NGOs, media organisations and embassies. RNTC's Online Academy provides independent online courses in English, Chinese, Arabic and French. Accredited by the Dutch Qualification Framework (NLQF), RNTC offers a six-month Honours Programme in ‘Advocacy Journalism in the Digital world.’ The programme covers data journalism, investigative journalism, video and podcast development as well as broadcast entrepreneurship, among other areas of work.
