= Hedy West =

American folk singer, song adapter and banjoist (1938–2005)

- West performing at Newport Folk Festival, 1964

Background information
- Born: Hedwig Grace West; April 6, 1938; Cartersville, Georgia, U.S.
- Origin: Cartersville, Georgia
- Died: July 3, 2005 (aged 67) Philadelphia, Pennsylvania, U.S.
- Genre: Folk music
- Occupations: Singer, songwriter
- Instruments: Vocals, banjo
- Years active: 1961–2005

Hedwig Grace "Hedy" West (April 6, 1938 – July 3, 2005) was an American folksinger, songwriter and song catcher. She belonged to the same generation of folk revivalists as Joan Baez, Judy Collins and Carolyn Hester. Her most famous song "500 Miles" is one of America's most popular folk songs. English folk musician A. L. Lloyd declared West to be "far and away the best of [the] American girl singers in the [folk] revival."

Hedy West played the guitar and the banjo. On banjo, she played both clawhammer style and a unique type of three-finger picking that showed influences beyond old-time and bluegrass such as blues and jazz. She is a 2022 inductee to the Georgia Women of Achievement.

== Early life and family influences ==
West was born in Cartersville in the mountains of northern Georgia in 1938. Her father, Don West, was a Southern poet and coal mine labor organizer in the 1930s; his bitter experiences included a friend killed. He co-founded the Highlander Folk School in New Market, Tennessee, and later ran the Appalachian South Folklife Center in Pipestem, West Virginia.

West's great-uncle Augustus Mulkey played the fiddle. Her paternal grandmother Lillie Mulkey West played the banjo. By her teens, West was singing at folk festivals, both locally and in neighboring states. In the mid-50s, she won a prize for ballad-singing in Nashville, TN. Many of her songs, including the raw materials for "500 Miles", came from Lillie West, who passed on the songs she had learned as a child. She used her father's poetry in several songs, such as "Anger in the Land".

Her family's politics were also a lifelong influence. West's liner notes for 1967's Old Times and Hard Times, written from self-imposed exile in London, are a personal statement on the corrosive effect of the Vietnam War, claiming, "We'll be controlled by manipulated fear". (See Folk-Legacy Records.) While living in Stony Brook, New York, in the late 1970s, she donated her time and talents to numerous benefit concerts for unfashionable causes — as did her fellow Appalachian-on-Long-Island, Jean Ritchie.

West's songs were rarely overt, topical protests. Her working-class mountain roots were in her voice, however, and ran through everything she sang, highlighting the lives of marginalized blue-collar workers including factory girls, servants, struggling farmers, coal miners, and single mothers.

== Education, career and later life ==
Hedy West graduated from Murphy High School in 1955 and attended Western Carolina College. In 1959, she moved to New York City to study music at Mannes College and drama at Columbia University. When she arrived and saw the folk revival taking place, she realized that the music the Northerners were playing was in fact music she had heard every day growing up. She embraced her folk side and started performing it around New York City. She later attributed some of her ability to get *inside* her songs to her early training as an actress. She was embraced by the Greenwich Village folk scene (most likely in no small part due to the fact that she actually came from the tradition they were reviving), and was invited by Pete Seeger to sing alongside him at a Carnegie Hall concert. Manny Solomon signed her to Vanguard Records after an appearance at the May 6, 1961, Indian Neck Folk Festival. After being included on the 1961 compilation album New Folks for Vanguard, she soon made two eponymous solo records for the company, enjoying critical praise.

West moved to Los Angeles in 1960, where she continued singing and married her first husband, aerospace engineer Karl Ludloff. The marriage did not last. While living in California she appeared at the 1962 Stanford Folk Festival. West performed at the Newport Folk Festival in 1964. In 1966, she appeared on Pete Seeger's Public Television series Rainbow Quest, in an episode headlined by Mississippi John Hurt. By this time, she was making regular visits to England. She then lived in London for several years, touring the country's folk clubs, and appearing at the Cambridge festival and the first Keele folk festival in addition to making regular visits to Europe, especially Germany. She recorded three albums for Bill Leader and A.L. Lloyd at Topic Records – Old Times and Hard Times (1965), Pretty Saro (1966) and Ballads (1967) together with another for Fontana, entitled Serves 'em Fine (1967).

For a few months in 1962, she had been engaged to Roger Zelazny, who became a well-known science fiction writer. In 1968, in London, she married broadcaster Pete Myers, one of the founding presenters of BBC Radio 1's Late Night Extra. It was a marriage of convenience, as Myers was gay, while the marriage allowed West to spend as much time as she liked on either side of the Atlantic. West and Myers later divorced.

At the time, West developed a close working relationship with the painter Gertrude Degenhardt, who illustrated a German-published collection of West's songs. In the autumn of 1970, West moved from Great Britain to West Germany, where she learned German and made two further recordings. The first, Getting Folk Out of the Country (1974), was recorded in London with fellow American Bill Clifton and released by FV Schallplatten. The second, Love, Hell and Biscuits (also entitled Whores, Hell and Biscuits), was released by Bear Family Records in 1976. In Germany, she met philosophy and psychology professor Joseph Katz (1920–88) who became her third husband in 1980 when they moved to Stony Brook, New York.

West picked her elderly grandparents' brains for scraps of their musical memory. She studied composition with David Lewin at Stony Brook University, living nearby with her husband, with whom she had a daughter, Talitha (b. 1980). She was an adjunct professor at Stony Brook, teaching two courses in folk music. One of her students, singer-songwriter Robin Greenstein, worked with West, cataloging her record and tape collection. From Long Island, she moved with her husband and daughter to Princeton, NJ. Then, in the early 1990s, following Katz's death in 1988, she moved to Lower Merion Township in the Philadelphia, Pennsylvania, suburbs, where she spent most of her final years. One of her last performances was at the Eisteddfod Festival sponsored by the Folk Music Society of New York at Polytechnic University in 2004.

West's most famous song was 500 Miles, which she put together from fragments of a melody she had heard her uncle sing to her back in Georgia. She copyrighted the resulting song. 500 Miles has been recorded by Bobby Bare (a Billboard Top 10 hit in 1963), The Highwaymen, The Kingston Trio, Peter, Paul and Mary, Peter & Gordon, Rosanne Cash, and many others. Another well-known song that she wrote and copyrighted (but which borrows heavily from existing traditional folk material) is "Cotton Mill Girl".

Cancer ruined her voice in her last years. A fine musical legacy is in unreleased recordings, such as a live concert from the 1978 University of Chicago Folk Festival, broadcast in her memory by The Midnight Special program of local radio station WFMT.

Hedy West died of cancer on July 3, 2005, at a hospital in Philadelphia.

== Discography ==
- New Folks, Vanguard VRS 9096 (1961) [Hedy has 5 tracks on this LP, 3 of which were reissued on The Original New Folks Vanguard CD, VCD-143/144 (1993)]
- Hedy West accompanying herself on the 5-string banjo, Vanguard VRS-9124 (1963)
- Hedy West, Volume 2, Vanguard VRS-9162 /VSD 79162 (1964)

[Note: The two eponymous recordings on Vanguard were combined into a single CD (with 2 bonus tracks) and reissued by Ace Records as Vanguard Masters VCD 79124 (2012).]

- Old Times & Hard Times: Ballads and Songs from the Appalachians, Topic 12T117 (London, 1965); Folk-Legacy FSA-32 (1967), reissued Folk-Legacy CD-32 (2004)
- Pretty Saro and other Appalachian Ballads, Topic 12T146 (1966)
- Ballads, Topic 12T163 (1967)
- Serves 'em Fine, Fontana U.K. STL 5432 (London, 1967) (accompanied by Martin Carthy)
- with Bill Clifton, Getting Folk Out of the Country, Folk Variety FV12008 / Bear Family BF15008 (1974), reissued on CD – Bear Family BCD 16754 (2010)
- Love, Hell and Biscuits, Bear Family BF15003 (1976) (accompanied by Tracy Schwarz), also released under the title Whores, Hell and Biscuits
- Three Score and Ten, Topic Records 70-year anniversary boxed set included Little Sadie from Ballads as track twenty on the seventh CD. (2009)
- Ballads And Songs From The Appalachians, Fellside FECD 241 (2011) – double CD, a reissue comprising the three Topic albums
- From Granmaw And Me, Fledg’ling Records FLED 3106 (April 2018) (disk labeled "With Granmaw and Me")
- Untitled, Fledg'ling Records FLED 3110 (April 2019) (previously unreleased material recorded in Germany in 1979 with Eloise and Tracy Schwarz (misspelled on CD package as "Tracey" "Schwartz")
