= PCJJ =

Defunct Dutch shortwave radio station

- Eindhoven; later Huizen; Netherlands
- Broadcast area: International
- Frequency: 30.2 m or 9.9 MHz (early test broadcasts)
- Branding: PCJ

Programming
- Languages: Dutch, English, Spanish, German and other languages
- Format: International broadcasting; shortwave radio

Ownership
- Owner: Philips Laboratories
- Sister stations: PHI / PHOHI

History
- First air date: 11 March 1927
- Last air date: May 1940 (pre-war PCJ/PHI operations interrupted); 15 April 1947 (succeeded by Radio Nederland Wereldomroep)
- Former call signs: PCJJ
- Call sign meaning: Later promoted by Eddy Startz as "Peace, Cheer and Joy"

PCJJ, later known as PCJ, was a pioneering Dutch shortwave radio station operated by Philips Laboratories in Eindhoven and later associated with the Philips Omroep Holland-Indië transmitter facilities at Huizen. It began experimental overseas broadcasting on 11 March 1927 and became one of the earliest dedicated international shortwave broadcasting stations.

PCJJ was created at a time when Philips was entering the consumer radio market and seeking to demonstrate that shortwave broadcasting could connect the Netherlands with the Dutch East Indies, the Dutch West Indies and other overseas audiences. Its programmes helped establish Dutch international broadcasting before the Second World War and formed part of the prehistory of Radio Netherlands Worldwide, which was founded in 1947.

PCJ was also the original home of Eddy Startz's Happy Station, a multilingual light-entertainment programme that began in 1928 and became one of the best-known programmes in international shortwave broadcasting.

== Background ==
Dutch interest in long-distance wireless communication had been shaped by the problem of maintaining reliable contact with the Netherlands' overseas empire. The Netherlands had already invested in longwave wireless telegraphy, including the large Radio Kootwijk and Radio Malabar installations, but shortwave experiments in the 1920s suggested that speech and music could be sent over intercontinental distances with less infrastructure and, potentially, better reception under favourable conditions.

Philips had initially concentrated on radio components and technical research. In 1925, the company created N.V. Philips Radio, and in 1926 it acquired the Nederlandsche Seintoestellen Fabriek (NSF), a major Dutch radio manufacturer. By September 1927, Philips was marketing complete consumer radio receivers. The company also used experimental broadcasting to stimulate demand for receivers, especially among Dutch listeners overseas.

The technical work behind PCJJ was associated with the Philips Natuurkundig Laboratorium (NatLab) in Eindhoven and engineers including Balthasar van der Pol and Johan Numans. Numans, then a young Delft engineering student working at Philips, proposed and helped build a shortwave telephony transmitter capable of carrying speech and music to the East Indies.

== First broadcasts ==
PCJJ's first successful overseas test was made on 11 March 1927. The station transmitted from Eindhoven on a wavelength of about 30.2 metres, approximately 9.93 MHz, with a Dutch and English announcement identifying it as a test broadcast from the Philips laboratory in Eindhoven. According to a Dutch transmitter museum account, the broadcast alternated speech and music for several hours. A confirmation telegram from Bandung in the Dutch East Indies reached Philips the following day, and thousands of telegrams and letters reportedly followed from listeners in many countries.

The first public success of the station came soon afterwards. On 31 March 1927, Queen Wilhelmina addressed listeners in the colonies through PCJJ, an event described by Beeld & Geluid as a publicity success for Philips. On 1 June 1927, Wilhelmina and Crown Princess Juliana spoke to Dutch listeners in the East Indies. Dutch press commentary emphasized the symbolic effect of bringing the Netherlands and its colonies closer together through Dutch technology.

PCJJ's early success demonstrated both the technical potential of shortwave broadcasting and its commercial value for Philips. It also attracted international attention because it showed that shortwave could be used for regular broadcast programming rather than only for experimental, amateur or point-to-point communication.

== PHOHI and colonial broadcasting ==
On 18 June 1927, Philips and seven Dutch East Indies commercial and plantation interests created N.V. Philips Omroep Holland-Indië, usually known as PHOHI. PHOHI was intended to provide programmes from the Netherlands for Dutch listeners in the East Indies and other colonial territories. After test broadcasts, PHOHI began regular broadcasts on 22 January 1929.

Scholars have interpreted PHOHI as a colonial broadcasting project as well as a technical and commercial venture. Vincent Kuitenbrouwer describes PHOHI as a company founded by influential entrepreneurs to strengthen ties between the Netherlands and the Dutch East Indies by reaching out to colonial expatriates. He argues that the service's organization and programme content were shaped by geopolitical and ideological considerations as well as by commercial aims.

PCJ and PHOHI were related but not identical. PHOHI focused primarily on Dutch-language broadcasts to the East Indies, while PCJ developed a broader international identity with programmes in several languages. In 1929, PCJJ's call sign was shortened to PCJ following changes in international call-sign practice.

PHOHI's operations were affected by Dutch broadcasting politics. Because the Dutch broadcasting system was organized around religious and ideological pillars, disputes arose over whether Dutch domestic broadcasting organizations should receive airtime on the colonial shortwave service. PHOHI resisted becoming a vehicle for some of these groups, particularly when programming was considered politically sensitive in the colonial context. The dispute contributed to PHOHI falling silent for several years; regular service resumed in 1934.

== Programming and Eddy Startz ==
Eddy Startz joined Philips' shortwave operation in 1928 and became PCJ's best-known announcer. Beeld & Geluid describes Startz as having begun as an announcer for the experimental Philips shortwave station PCJ and later PHOHI, where he turned the call letters PCJ into the slogan "Peace, Cheer and Joy". His informal and multilingual style gave the station a distinctive international identity.

Startz created Happy Station, a light-entertainment programme using recorded music, listener mail, travel talk and multilingual announcements. The programme was promoted as friendly and non-political, and it helped PCJ cultivate a community of listeners who sent reception reports, letters and QSL card requests from around the world. Startz also used the slogan "Keep in touch with the Dutch", encouraging foreign listeners to associate the station with Dutch culture, travel and technological modernity.

Happy Station continued after the Second World War on Radio Nederland Wereldomroep and became one of the longest-running programmes associated with international shortwave broadcasting. Startz was naturalized as a Dutch citizen in 1936 and became programme leader of PHOHI in 1938.

== Radio Nations broadcasts ==
PCJ also played a role in the early broadcasting experiments of the League of Nations. Beginning in the late 1920s, League of Nations material was sent by landline from Geneva and broadcast over Dutch shortwave facilities using the call sign PCLL. Jerome Berg notes that the Geneva office of the League had made broadcasts over PCLL by 1928 and that these transmissions expanded in 1929 to reach particular regions, including the Americas, Japan and Australia. These broadcasts anticipated the League's own Swiss shortwave transmitters, HBL and HBP, which later carried the Radio Nations service from Switzerland.

== Huizen transmitter station ==
As the service expanded, the transmitter facilities associated with PCJ and PHOHI were developed at Huizen, near Hilversum. PHOHI's own transmitter facilities were associated with the Huizen site from the late 1920s, while studios and office functions were located in nearby Hilversum.

By the late 1930s, the Philips shortwave operation had been substantially upgraded. A Dutch transmitter museum account states that in 1937 the transmitter was moved from Eindhoven to Huizen, enlarged, and raised to 60 kW, making it the most powerful shortwave transmitter in Europe at the time. The Huizen installation became known for its directional antenna system, including large rotatable wooden aerial structures designed to aim shortwave signals toward different parts of the world.

== Second World War ==
Broadcasting from the Netherlands was interrupted by the German invasion in May 1940. Radio Netherlands' later anniversary history states that Dutch shortwave operations were suspended after the invasion and that German forces later repaired PCJJ equipment and used it for propaganda broadcasts to India under the name "The Voice of Free India".

Startz withdrew from broadcasting during the German occupation. Beeld & Geluid states that in 1946 he was asked by those involved in building a postwar world broadcasting service to return to the microphone, although much of his record collection had been stolen during the war.

== Postwar transition to Radio Netherlands ==
The Dutch government-in-exile had created Radio Oranje in London during the war. Its director, Hendrik van den Broek, later helped restart Dutch broadcasting from liberated territory. On 3 October 1944, Radio Herrijzend Nederland began broadcasting from Eindhoven using Philips facilities.

On 24 May 1945, a first postwar "world programme" was broadcast for Dutch people outside the Netherlands, with assistance from the BBC because Dutch shortwave facilities had been damaged or destroyed during the war. In July 1945, the Dutch government created Stichting Radio Nederland in den Overgangstijd, which was responsible for both domestic and international broadcasting during the transition period. From 13 October 1945, regular programmes again used the name PCJ Radio Nederland Wereld Omroep in Dutch, Indonesian, Spanish and English.

After debate over the organization of postwar broadcasting, domestic and international broadcasting were separated. On 15 April 1947, Stichting Radio Nederland Wereldomroep was established to prepare and produce programmes intended for reception outside the Netherlands. PCJ and PHI were thereby succeeded by the new Dutch international service, although the PCJ name continued to be used in some early Radio Netherlands schedules.

== Legacy ==
PCJJ and PCJ occupy an important place in the history of shortwave broadcasting because they demonstrated the practical use of high-power shortwave for regular international programming. Their broadcasts also linked radio technology with Dutch commercial expansion, imperial communication and national image-making.

The station's legacy is visible in three related areas. Technically, it helped establish the Netherlands as an early centre of intercontinental shortwave experimentation. Institutionally, it was a precursor to Radio Nederland Wereldomroep, although the postwar service was created as a separate public foundation rather than as a simple continuation of Philips' private operation. Culturally, PCJ is remembered especially through Eddy Startz and Happy Station, which survived the transition from Philips' shortwave station to the postwar Dutch international service.

The PCJ name has also had later symbolic use among shortwave enthusiasts. Taiwan-based PCJ Radio International, which produced a revived version of Happy Station from 2009 to 2020, took its name from the original Dutch station.

== See also ==
- Happy Station Show
- PHOHI
- Radio Netherlands Worldwide
- Radio Oranje
- Shortwave radio
- Radio Kootwijk
- Dutch East Indies
