= Electronics Illustrated =

US magazine

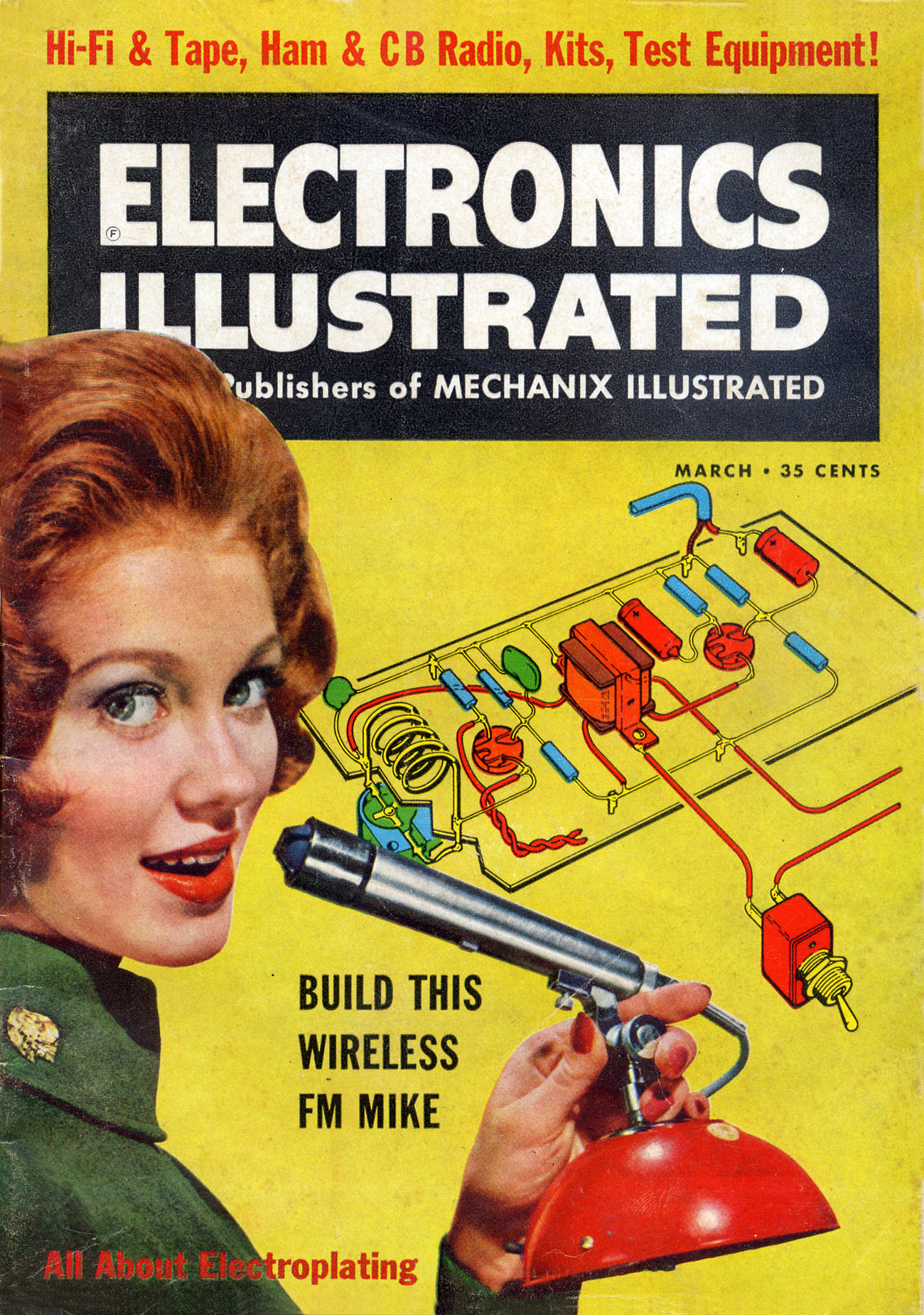
- March 1961, Wireless Microphone
- Editor: Robert Beason
- Categories: Hobby magazines
- Frequency: Bi-monthly
- Publisher: George Allen
- First issue: May 1958
- Final issue Number: November 1972; Vol. 15 No. 6
- Company: Fawcett Publications
- Country: USA
- Based in: Greenwich, Connecticut
- Language: English

Electronics Illustrated was an American magazine started in May 1958 by Fawcett Publications, the publishers of Mechanix Illustrated. The magazine was published monthly from 1959 to 1961 then bi-monthly until November 1972. Charles Tepfer was the first editor and Robert Beason was the editor for rest of the magazine's run (1961 -1972). The headquarters was in Greenwich, Connecticut.

Ziff-Davis success with Popular Electronics magazine showed there was a market for electronics hobbyist magazines and the launch of the Sputnik satellite in 1957 had increased the public's interest in science and technology. Electronics Illustrated (EI) was targeted for this hobbyist and do-it-yourself audience.

The cover of the second issue had a 6-foot-tall (1.8 m) rocket built in a basement workshop. To promote amateur rocketry the U.S. Army began a series titled "Build a Safe Model Missile." Model rockets appeared on the covers and in articles for several years. The space race between the United States and the Soviet Union led many hobbyists into amateur rocketry. In the late 1960s Micro Instrumentation and Telemetry Systems (MITS) was formed to sell instrumentation to rocket hobbyist. They were unsuccessful at that venture but later created the Altair 8800 computer kit that sparked the home computer revolution.

The construction projects in Electronics Illustrated were assembled and checked by the editors. The articles had numerous photos and always included a wiring diagram in addition to the schematic. The projects were not as complex as those in other magazines but they appealed to the beginner. The magazine also had introductory theory articles in every issue.

Radio was another focus of the magazine with many articles on Citizens Band (CB), Amateur Radio and Short Wave Listening (SWL)

Robert Hertzberg began an amateur radio column, The Ham Shack, in April 1961. Hertzberg got his license in 1919 and had been writing about amateur radio ever since. The column was taken over by Wayne Greene, the publisher of 73 magazine, as early as 1970.

In the final years of magazine, Tom Kneitel wrote a column in Electronics Illustrated that was similar to Tom McCahill column in Mechanix Illustrated.

== See also ==
- Popular magazines
  - Popular Mechanics
  - Popular Science
  - Popular Electronics
    - Poptronics
- Electronics Now
- Radio-Electronics
