= Henk Bos (painter) =

Dutch painter

Henk Bos (2 April 1901, in Huizen – 18 November 1979, in Huizen) was a Dutch painter.

His artwork is heavily indebted to the more traditional still lives of the Old Masters and displays characteristics typical of this genre of painting. His work is unusual for its traditional aspects that go against the rest of the art world at the time which was much more interested in avant-garde art that embodied the modern condition and techniques. Bos died in 1979.
