= Huizen transmitter =

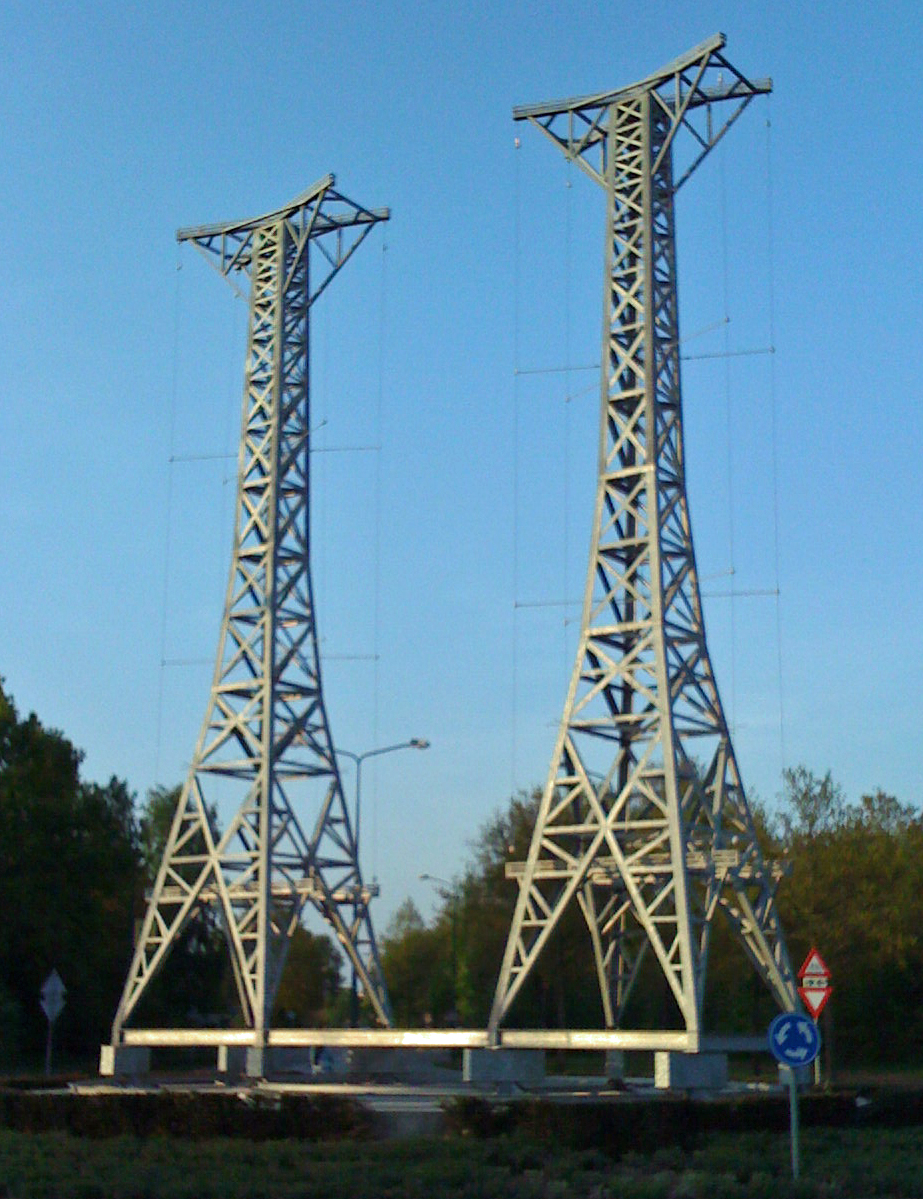
- 1:5 Pohi monument: replica of the Phohi (Philips Broadcasting Holland Indonesia) transmitters used in Huizen(nl) between 1920 and 1940

- Location within North Holland Location within Netherlands
- Location: Rotonde Blaricummerstraat - Randweg Midden, Huizen
- Coordinates: 52°17′15″N 5°14′32″E
- Built: 1923
- Demolished: 1940

The Huizen transmitter was one of the first large-scale radio transmitting stations to be built in the Netherlands.

== History ==
It was opened in 1923 as an experimental 500-watt transmitter, and its power was increased to 5000 watts in 1926.

The original Huizen transmitter towers were well-known local landmarks, frequently depicted on postcards. In 1935, however, they were demolished following the erection of a mast radiator near Hilversum.

In 1937 what were possibly the world's first rotating shortwave transmission antennas were erected at Huizen, consisting of two wooden 60-metre high towers. They were demolished in 1940 by retreating Dutch troops during the German invasion of the Netherlands. A replica of the shortwave antennas today stands on a traffic roundabout in Huizen.
