= Media Network =

Dutch radio program

Media Network is the name of a weekly radio programme broadcast on Radio Netherlands Worldwide from 7 May 1981 until 26 October 2000. When the programme began the station was known as Radio Nederland, but was renamed Radio Netherlands shortly thereafter. The programme concentrated on communications topics with particular reference to international shortwave broadcasting, but also went on to cover mediumwave and longwave, television, satellite, internet, reviews of shortwave receivers and other electronic devices. It was produced and presented by Jonathan Marks. In the course of 1994, he was joined by colleague Diana Janssen, who was working as a media researcher at the station, co-hosted the show until shortly before its end. Media Network ran for over 1000 editions.

== Early history ==
Jonathan Marks, a British radio producer arrived in the Netherlands in August 1980. He had previously freelanced for Radio Austria International in the period 1976–1980 and briefly for the World Radio Club programme running on the BBC World Service. He was hired as the fifth host of the Radio Nederland "DX Jukebox" programme, a technical show that had been running on the English service since the 1958. His first show was broadcast on 7 August 1980. The content of "DX Jukebox" also revolved around shortwave broadcasting, giving information on schedules for various other stations as well as a variety of details on improving reception. As the name suggested, a portion of the show was devoted to music.

Marks decided that the show needed to be updated to reflect a new era. Fewer listeners were building their own radios. The music was shortened and a name change was also planned for the middle of 1981, with Media Network being the name suggested by Roger Broadbent, a colleague producer. Audience reactions suggested a demand for a new style of programme to be not just about when and on what frequency one could listen to a given station on shortwave, but also about why one should listen.

During the early 1980s, a time when international telephony was still of a potentially mediocre sound quality (making it unsuitable for shortwave broadcasts), Media Network went against the established wisdom and made extensive use of the telephone. Calls were made to the show's various contributors. On many occasions where telephone quality was deemed too poor for broadcast, a tape recording was made at both ends of the line, then the person with whom Marks was speaking would post the tape to the Netherlands. The two recordings were subsequently edited together resulting in a conversation with much better sound quality.

== Show format ==
Over the years the show had many regular contributors who provided valuable information on stations that went on or off the air, radio propagation conditions, new communications technology and the development of digital formats such as DAT, CD and DVD. Listeners were also encouraged to telephone an answer line and leave their comments and questions. These messages became an integral part of the programme.

The show prided itself on being less predictable than its predecessor by reporting from international conferences, compiling thematic documentaries and organising its own research surveys into radio related publications and receivers. On some occasions, the reviews of receivers conducted by the show had an influence on the manufacturers who later contacted Media Network for advice on improving their products.

Specials covered historic events as conveyed by the media, such as the first Gulf War, the Falklands War and propaganda during World War II and in more recent conflicts. There were also many DXpeditions or media safari documentaries to profile stations in different parts of the world (e.g. South Africa, Argentina, Australia, New Zealand, Bonaire).

Media Network was also well known for its independent and impartial reviews of radio receivers often produced in conjunction with World Radio TV Handbook.

== Radio programme becomes weblog ==
After Diana Janssen left the show in September 2000 to pursue another career with Forrester Research, Jonathan Marks (who was also employed as Radio Netherlands' Director of Programmes) made the decision to end the show. He cited the increasingly demanding task of fulfilling a corporate role at Radio Netherlands combined with producing a show of a "high standard that we strive for and you deserve". The four editions that followed were replays of popular specials with a finale on 26 October 2000. The editorship of the program was handed over to Andy Sennitt (a frequent contributor also working at Radio Netherlands) who continued the brand as a weblog until 24 March 2012, shortly before Sennitt retired.
