= The Saturday Show (Swedish radio program) =

The Radio Sweden Saturday Show, with Roger Wallis and Kim Loughran, ran from 1967 to 1981. The program was launched to showcase Swedish rock and pop music, especially the Swedish progressive music or alternative music scene, in a world dominated by American and British rock.

Using Radio Sweden's relatively high-powered medium wave transmitter on 1179 kHz, the entire program was 90 minutes in length, and features many satirical sketches, often political and sometimes controversial. A 30-minute segment of the entire broadcast was the Radio Sweden shortwave program on Saturdays.

Sidney Coulson ("the Major General"), Jonny Mair, and George Wood often lent their voices to the sketches.
