= Happy Station Show =

The Happy Station Show
- Other names: La Estación de la Alegría
- Genre: light entertainment
- Running time: 48–90 minutes
- Country of origin: Netherlands (English: 1928–1995; Spanish: 1928–1999); Taiwan (2009–2020)
- Home station: PCJJ (1928–1940), Radio Nederland in den Overgangstijd (1946–1947), Radio Netherlands (1947–1995), PCJ Radio (2009–2020)
- Starring: Eddy Startz (1928–1969), Tom Meijer (1970–1993), Pete Myers (1993–1994), Jonathan Groubert (1994–1995), Jaime Báguena (Spanish; 1992–1999), Keith Perron (2009–2020)
- Created by: Eddy Startz
- Original release: 19 November 1928 – 17 September 1995; Revived series: 12 March 2009 – 27 December 2020

The Happy Station Show was a long-running international shortwave radio programme created by Eddy Startz for the Dutch Philips station PCJJ in 1928. It was later associated with Radio Netherlands Worldwide, where it became one of the broadcaster's best-known English-language and Spanish-language light entertainment programmes.

The original show followed a format of light entertainment, music, listener correspondence, multilingual presentation, special guests and information about Dutch life. Under Tom Meijer in the 1970s, the programme also became known for live international telephone call-ins and listener-interaction features.

Happy Station was described by The Washington Post in 1994 as a programme with a global following that had been on the air for 65 years, interrupted only by the Second World War. Contemporary press accounts also reported large claimed audiences: The Hollywood Reporter stated in 1938 that the programme claimed an audience of 100 million, while the Windsor Star reported in 1971 that Radio Netherlands programmes including Happy Station reached an estimated audience of 25 million. Startz claimed in 1936 that PCJ had received one million reception reports and QSL cards since the show began.

The Radio Netherlands English-language version ended on 17 September 1995. A revived, independent version, produced by Keith Perron through PCJ Media, began in 2009 and continued until 2020.

== History ==
=== Eddy Startz ===
The programme premiered on 19 November 1928 and was broadcast by the private Philips shortwave station PCJJ, later known as PCJ. PCJ was part of Dutch international shortwave broadcasting connected with Philips and with broadcasting to the Dutch East Indies. Separate English and Spanish versions were later broadcast around the world on shortwave.

Startz developed a multilingual, informal presenting style. The programme mixed popular music from Europe and other countries with announcements, listener correspondence and light patter in several languages. A 1938 Variety profile described Startz as switching between languages during a single broadcast and presenting light entertainment for an international audience.

Startz associated the programme and PCJ with the slogan "Peace, Cheer and Joy". He used Happy Station to cultivate international goodwill and to encourage listeners to "keep in touch with the Dutch". Kuitenbrouwer argues that the programme's popularity also served Dutch overseas cultural and imperial aims by projecting a positive image of the Netherlands and Dutch colonial broadcasting.

A recurring feature of the Startz era was listener correspondence. Startz encouraged reception reports and letters from international listeners, and a mail segment became an important part of the programme. According to Berg, Startz introduced the mailbag with his signature tune, "A Nice Cup of Tea" by Henry Hall, accompanied by the sound of a spoon tapping a teacup. The programme was also known for its musical opening, which included the Dutch national anthem.

Under Startz, Happy Station was originally a 90-minute programme and was for many years broadcast more than once a week. In 1964, the programme was reduced to 80 minutes. A 1948 Radio Nederland schedule listed Happy Station as part of the international programme service and described the programme as including music, announcements, listener mail and a "Spotlight on Holland" feature.

Happy Station was promoted as a respite from the crisis and propaganda that dominated much international radio in the late 1930s. In 1938, the Detroit Free Press quoted Startz as saying that listeners abroad were tired of nationalist propaganda from dictatorships. In 1939, The New York Times quoted the programme's promise that listeners would hear no war news from the station. In April 1940, during the Phoney War, The New York Times contrasted Startz's light presentation with wartime propaganda and news broadcasts elsewhere on the shortwave bands.

Broadcasts from the Netherlands were interrupted by the German invasion of the Netherlands in May 1940. Startz was arrested during the invasion, and PCJ's transmitters were damaged or disabled to prevent their use by German forces. Startz remained away from broadcasting for most of the war.

After liberation, Startz joined Radio Herrijzend Nederland (Radio Resurgent Netherlands), a transitional broadcaster founded by the Dutch government in 1944. Happy Station resumed after the war and was carried by Stichting Radio Nederland in den Overgangstijd before being incorporated into the new Radio Nederland Wereldomroep in 1947.

Edward "Eddy" Startz presented the programme from its inception until his retirement at the end of 1969. He was born Eduard Franz Conradin Startz in Aachen, Germany, on 20 February 1899 and died in Zeist on 17 March 1976. Before joining PCJ, he had travelled in the Americas and worked in various jobs, experience that contributed to the multilingual style he later used on the air. He became a Dutch citizen in 1936 and programme leader of PHOHI/PCJ in 1938.

=== Tom Meijer ===
Tom Meijer succeeded Startz in 1970 and hosted the English and Spanish versions of Happy Station until 1993. Meijer was born Thomas Hendrik Meijer on 16 November 1938 and was often known to international listeners as "Tom Meyer".

Meijer joined Radio Nederland in 1965 as a Dutch-language announcer and became the presenter of the English and Spanish versions of Happy Station after Startz's retirement. Under Meijer, the show retained its music-and-mailbag format but adopted a more contemporary style. Beeld en Geluid notes that Meijer's slogan was "Smiles across the Miles".

The programme also became known for live intercontinental telephone call-ins, outside broadcasts, travel features and listener-participation items during the Meijer era. Meijer presented the English and Spanish versions to different transmission areas on Sundays, meaning that the programme was heard repeatedly across time zones. The show was reduced from 80 minutes to 50 minutes in 1977, as part of wider changes to Radio Netherlands programming.

=== Later Radio Netherlands years ===
Meijer was followed as host of the English version by Pete Myers, a veteran BBC and Radio Netherlands broadcaster, from 1993 to 1994. Myers was brought in to update the programme and attract younger listeners. In a 1994 interview with Sara Henley, published by The Washington Post, Myers described changing the music and style of the programme, while also acknowledging complaints from traditional listeners.

Jonathan Groubert, who had worked with Myers, subsequently presented the English-language version until Radio Netherlands retired the programme on 17 September 1995. Radio Netherlands Archives describes the 1995 broadcast as the last Happy Station programme on Radio Netherlands.

The Spanish-language version, La Estación de la Alegría, continued after the end of the English version and was hosted in its later years by Jaime Báguena. Berg states that the Spanish programme remained on Radio Netherlands after the English version had ended. It was later replaced by similar Spanish-language listener-mail programming on Radio Netherlands.

== Revival ==
In 2009, Keith Perron revived The Happy Station Show as an independent programme produced through PCJ Media from Taipei. The revival was not a Radio Netherlands Worldwide production. Kuitenbrouwer describes the revived programme as a podcast produced by Perron through PCJ Media.

The revived programme was also distributed through shortwave relays, including broadcasts via WRMI in the United States, and through internet streaming and podcasting. Tom Meijer made occasional contributions to the revived version, and Jonathan Groubert also appeared as a guest. The final edition of the revived programme aired on 27 December 2020.
