= Huizen =

- Municipality
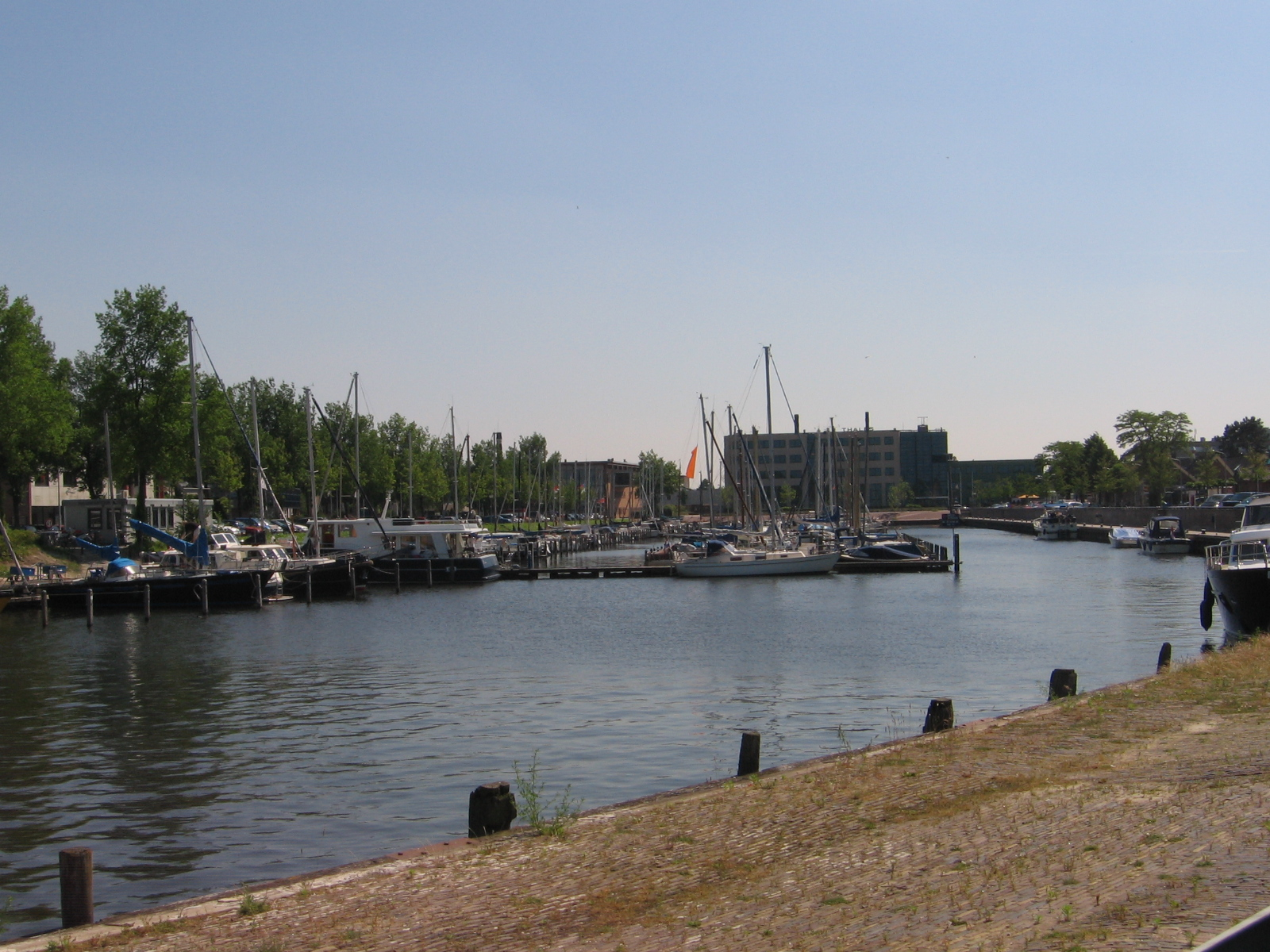
- Harbour of Huizen

- Flag Coat of arms

- Location in North Holland
- Coordinates: 52°18′N 5°15′E
- Country: Netherlands
- Province: North Holland
- Region: Amsterdam metropolitan area

Government
  - Body: Municipal council
  - Mayor: Serge Ferraro (VVD)

Area
  - Total: 23.32 km^{2} (9.00 sq mi)
  - Land: 15.81 km^{2} (6.10 sq mi)
  - Water: 7.51 km^{2} (2.90 sq mi)
- Elevation: 3 m (9.8 ft)

Population (January 2021)
  - Total: 41,090
  - Density: 2,599/km^{2} (6,730/sq mi)
- Demonym(s): Huizenaar, Huizer
- Time zone: UTC+1 (CET)
  - Summer (DST): UTC+2 (CEST)
- Postcode: 1270–1277
- Area code: 035
- Website: www.huizen.nl

Huizen (pronounced [ˈɦœyzə(n)]) is a municipality and a village in the province of North Holland, the Netherlands.

The name "Huizen" is Dutch for "houses" and this usage has been linked to the belief that the first stone houses in the region, instead of the more common sod houses of the time, appeared here. Huizen is part of the metropolitan area of Amsterdam.

== History ==
Huizen was originally an agricultural village, near the Zuiderzee until 1932. During winter the farmers went fishing, which started the development from an agricultural to a coastal village with a thriving fishing industry, stimulated by building the harbour around 1850. After the damming of the Zuiderzee in 1932, the old sea became a lake, and economic activity shifted towards industry and commerce.

In the 1960s the town was designated to build substantially large residential areas, to overcome the housing shortage in the region. From then on, the village took on an influx of people and grew rapidly.

Where the Phohi-flat now stands in Huizen, before World War II was a large transmitter intended to contact the Dutch East Indies, some 12,000 km away.

A post mill that stood in Huizen was dismantled in 1916. It was re-erected in 1919 at the Netherlands Open Air Museum, Arnhem, Gelderland.

== Topography ==
Huizen is part of the Gooi area, well known as the home of the rich and famous.

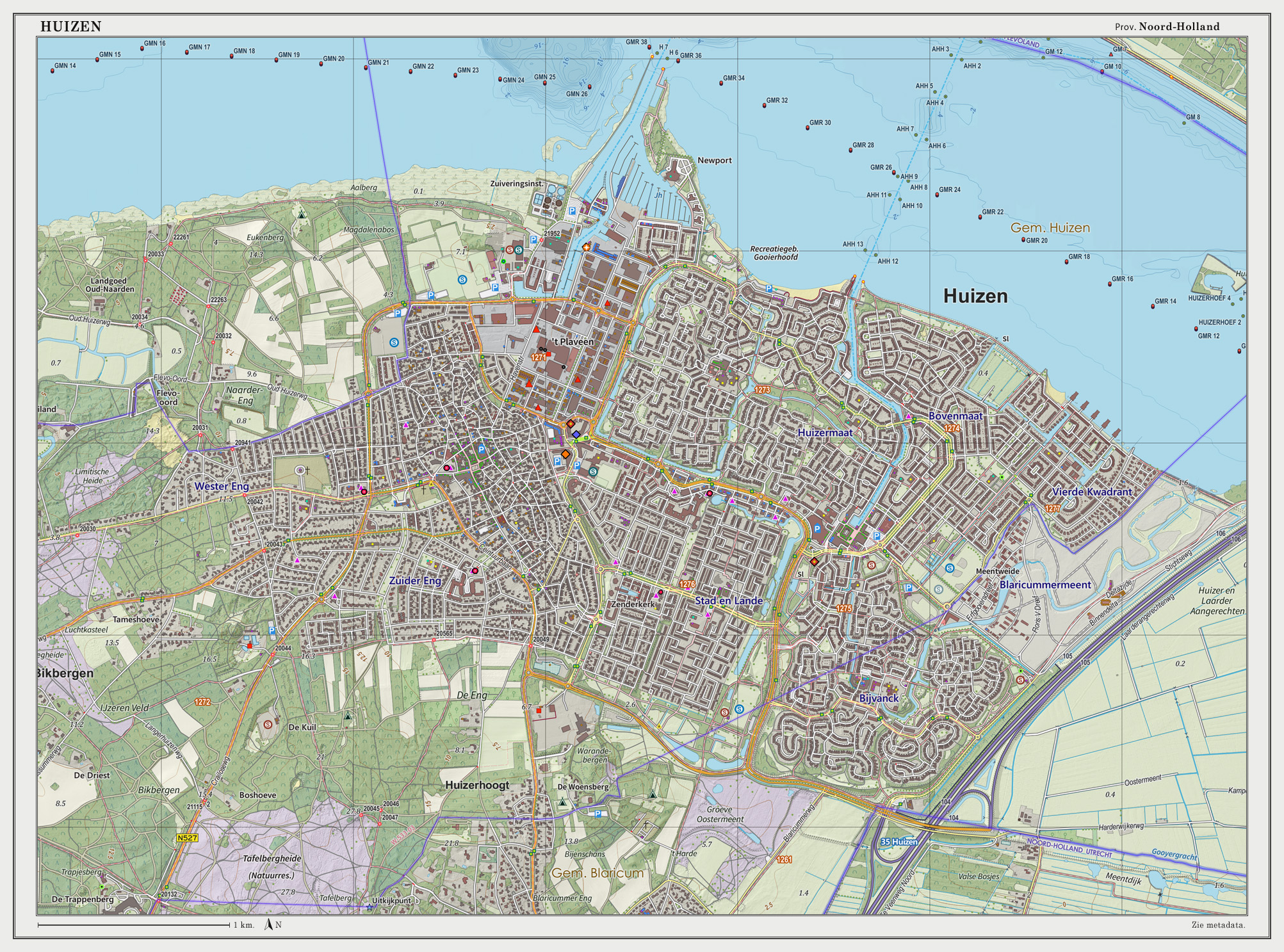
Map of Huizen, March 2014.

== Local government ==
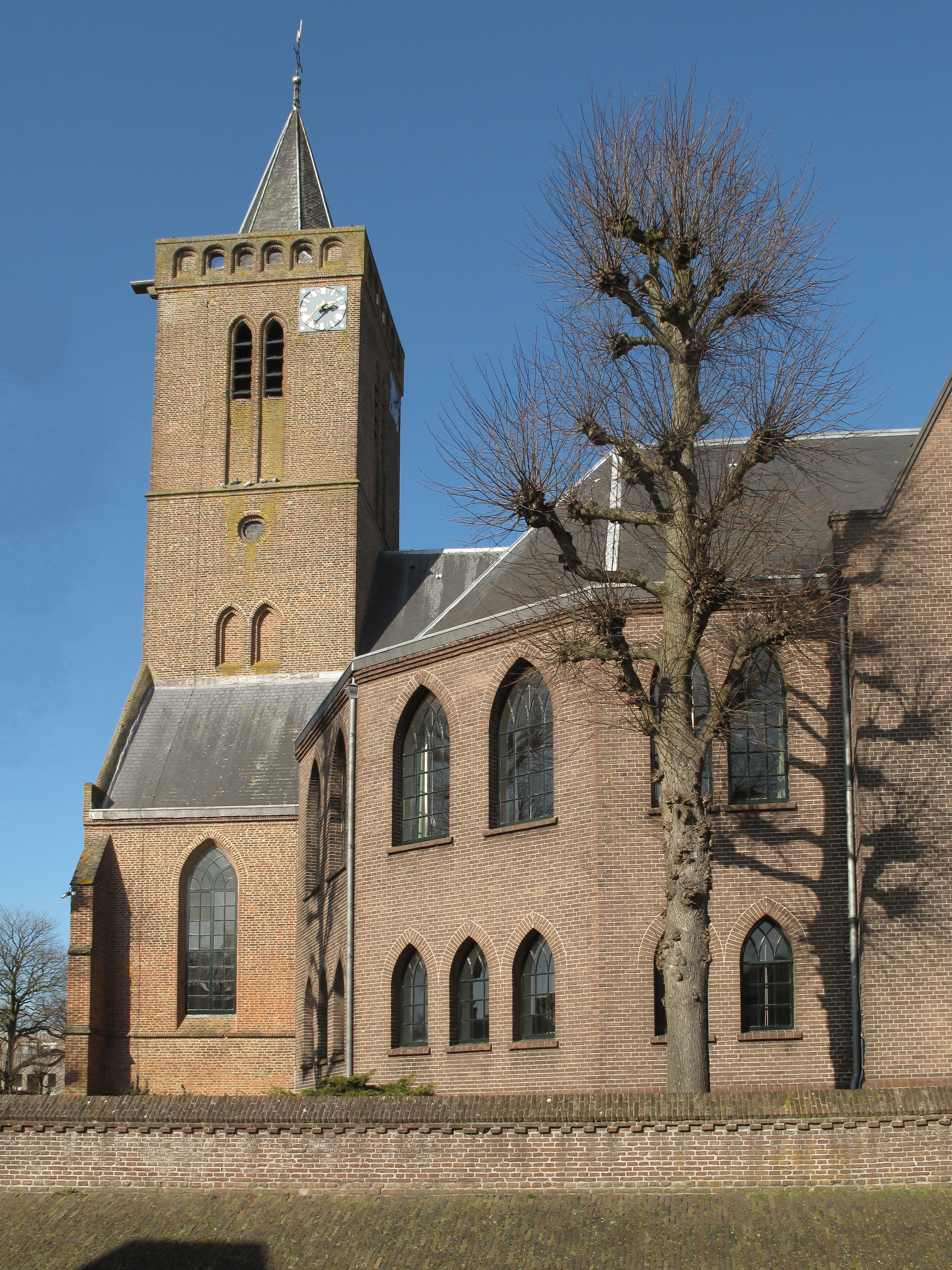
Huizen, church: de Oude Kerk

The municipal council of Huizen consists of 27 seats, which at the 2026 municipal elections divided as follows:

- VVD - 5 seats
- GroenLinks / PvdA - 4 seats
- Leefbaar Huizen - 3 seats
- CDA - 3 seats
- D66 - 3 seats
- Forum for Democracy - 3 seats
- PIT Huizen - 2 seats
- Gemeente Belangen Huizen - 1 seat
- ChristenUnie - 1 seat
- Transparant Huizen - 1 seat
- SGP - 1 seat
- Dorpsbelangen Huizen - X seats

== Transport ==
With its population of close to 42,000, Huizen is one of the larger Dutch towns without railway connection. On a national level, it's preceded by Drachten and Oosterhout.

== Notable people ==
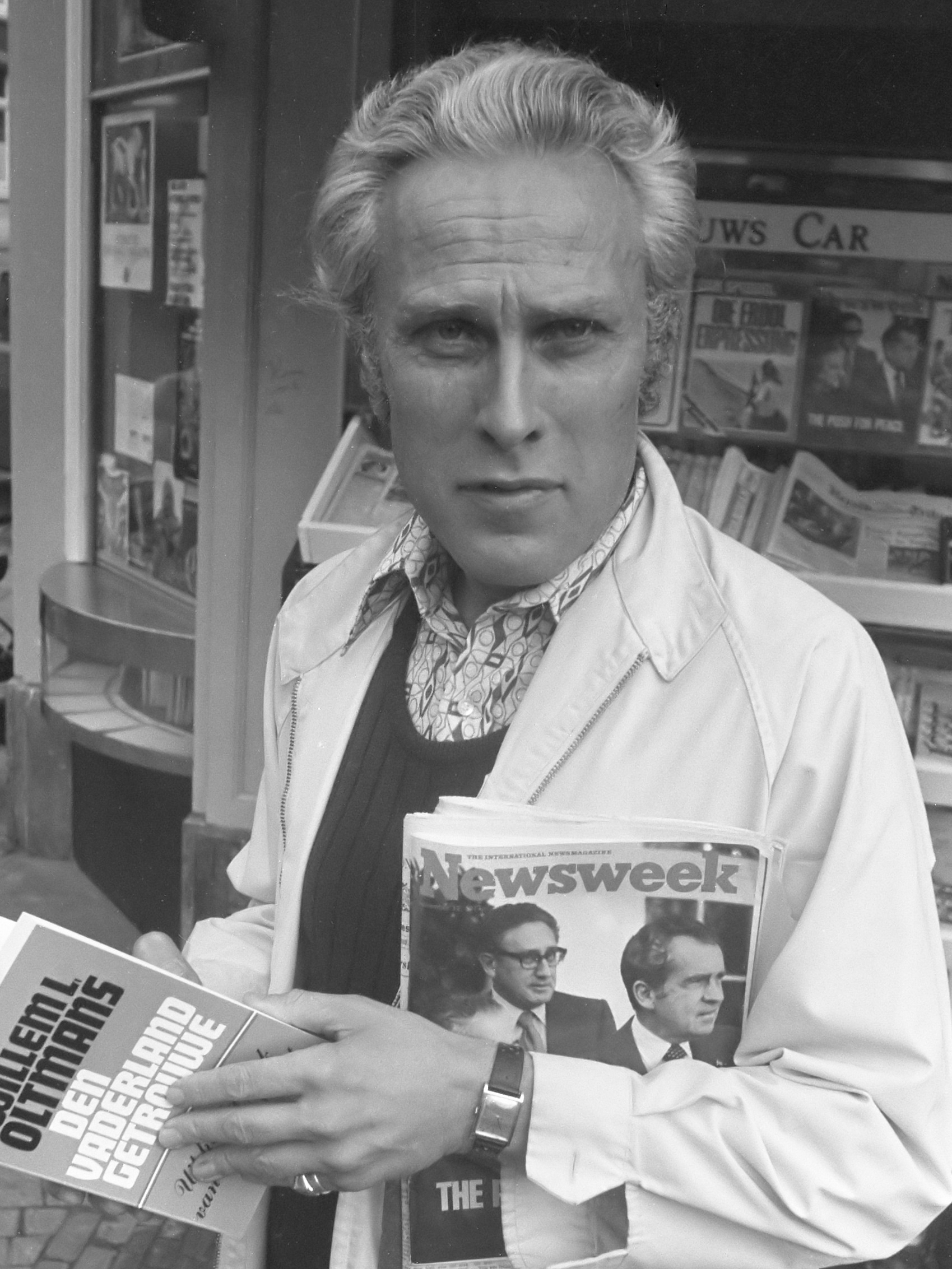
Willem Oltmans, 1973

- Henk Bos (1901–1979) a painter
- Karel Voous (1920–2002) an ornithologist and author
- Willem Oltmans (1925–2004) an investigative journalist and author
- Dorret Boomsma (born 1957 in Huizen) a biological psychologist specializing in genetics and twin studies
- Arnoud Boot (born 1960) an economist and academic
- Femke Merel van Kooten (born 1983) a politician, former member of the Dutch House of Representatives and leader of Splinter
- Sophia Sinot, a makeup artist

=== Sport ===
- Sofyan Amrabat (born 1996) footballer for Fenerbahçe and the Morocco national team
- Michiel Dudok van Heel (1924–2003) a sailor, competed at the 1952 Summer Olympics
- Nick de Jong (born 1942) a retired sailor, competed at the 1964 Summer Olympics
- Noémi Boekel (born 1984 in Huizen) a Dutch softball player, competed at the 2008 Summer Olympics
- Marlou van der Kulk (born 1993) a Dutch Paralympic swimmer, bronze medallist at the 2012 Summer Paralympics

== Gallery ==
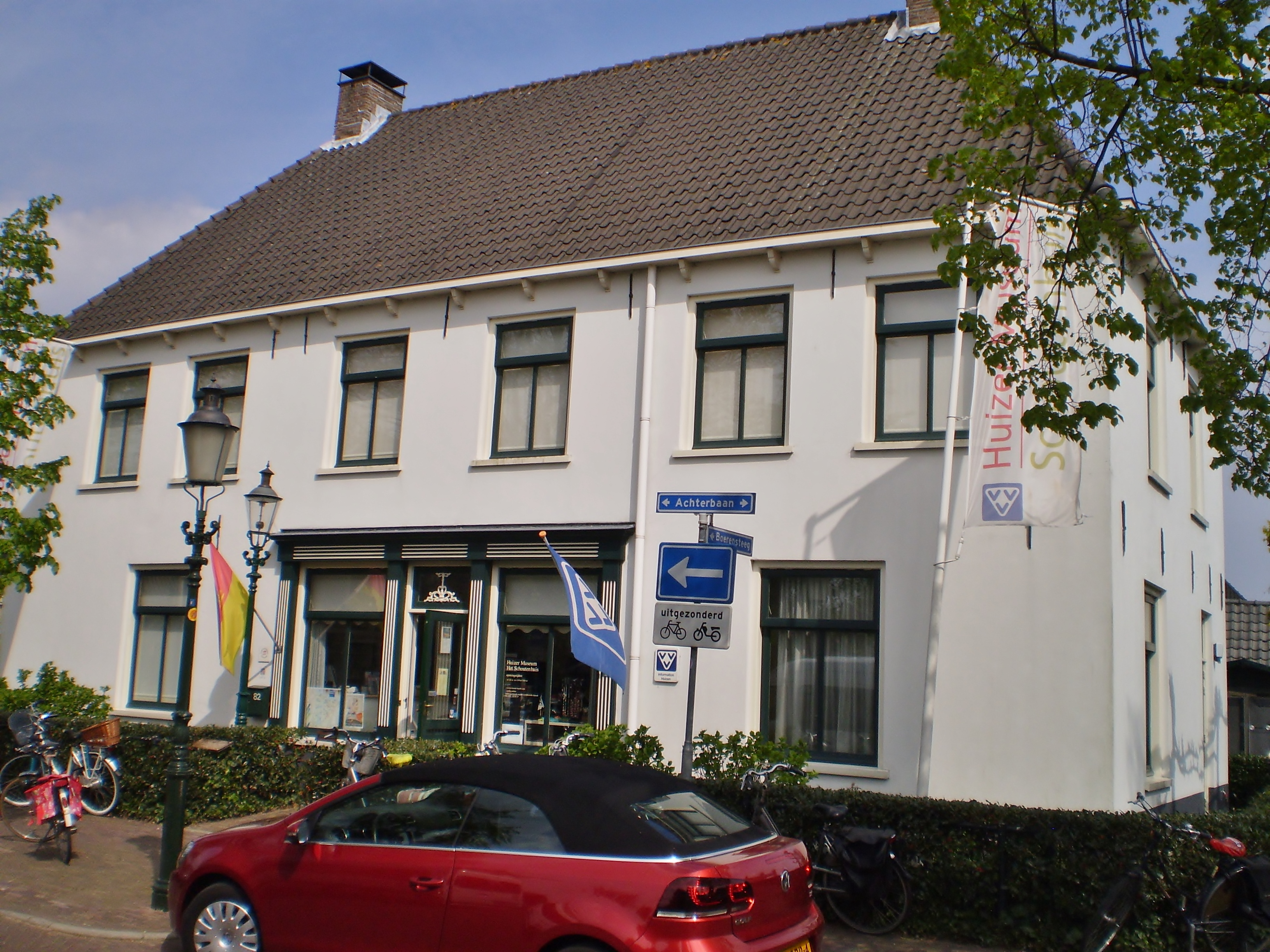
Huizer Museum Het Schoutenhuis Achterbaan

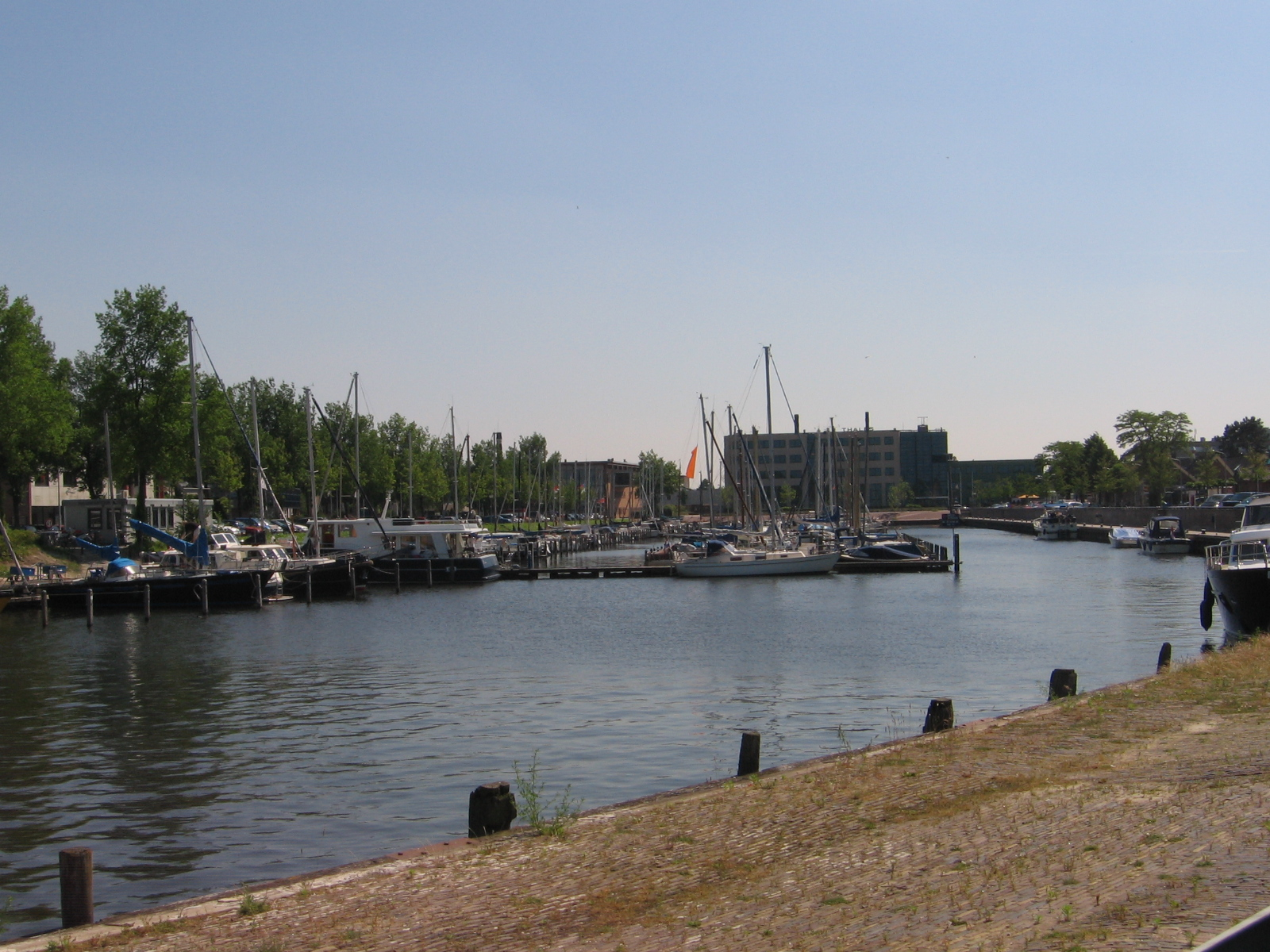
Huizen harbour

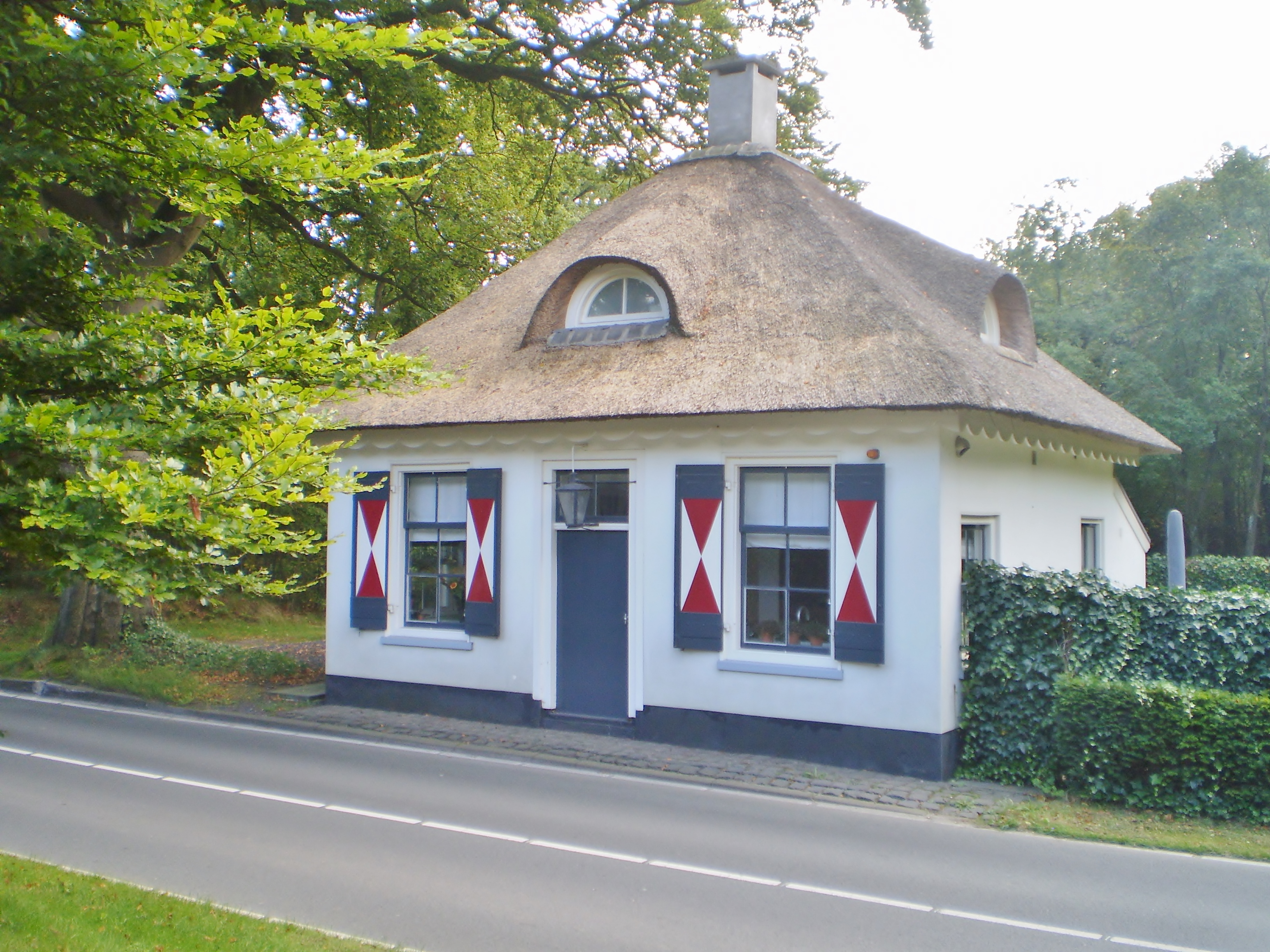
Huizen Naarderstraat toll house

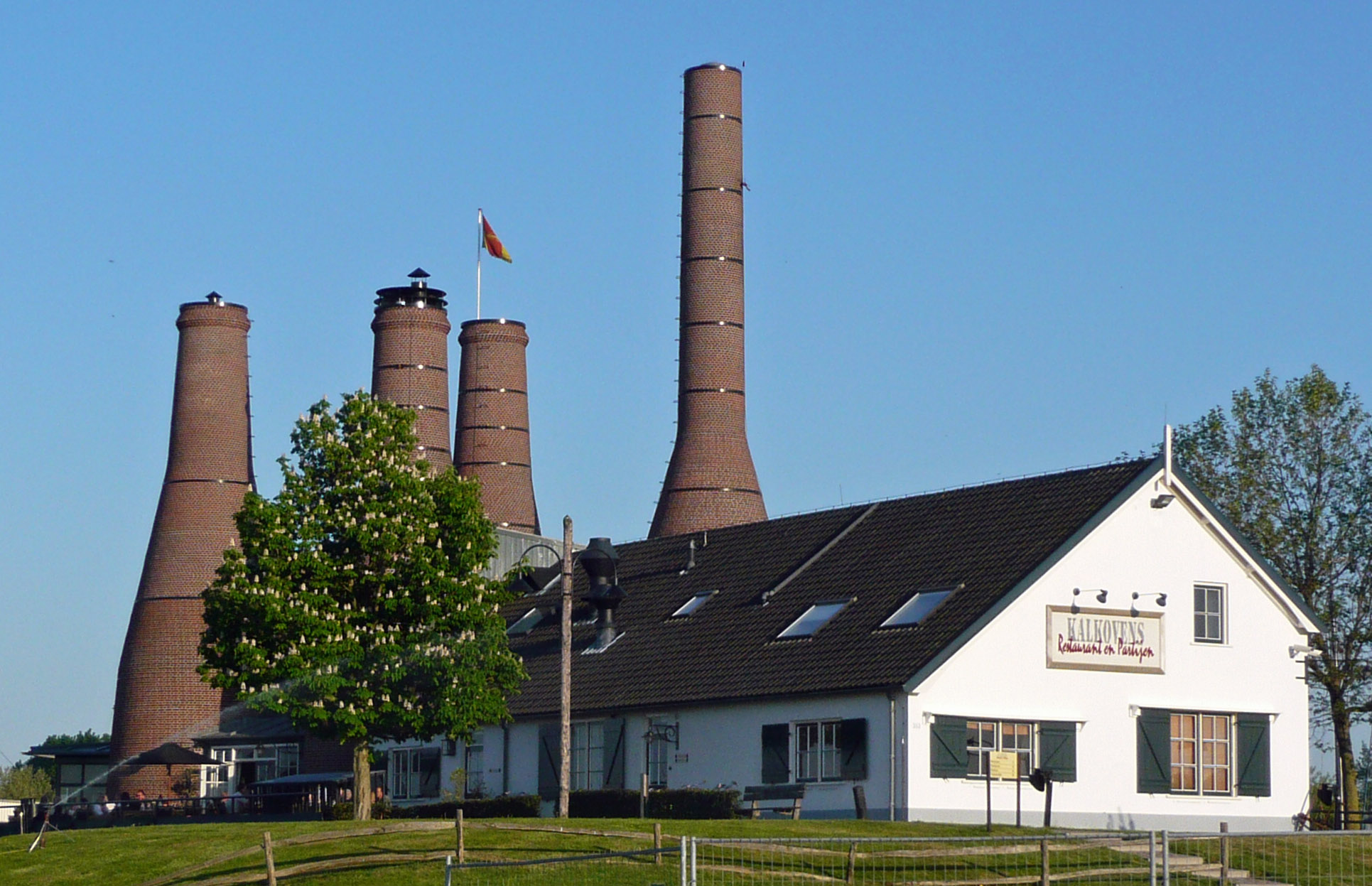
Huizen-kalkovens
