= FUNET =

Backbone network for Finnish universities

The FUNET backbone connects to the outside world via NORDUnet and GÉANT (map from 2008).

FUNET is the Finnish University and Research Network, a backbone network providing Internet connections for Finnish universities and polytechnics as well as other research facilities. It is governed by the state-owned CSC – IT Center for Science Ltd. The FUNET project started in December 1983 and soon gained international connectivity via EARN with DECnet as the dominant protocol. FUNET was connected to the greater Internet through NORDUnet in 1988. The FUNET FTP service went online in 1990, hosting the first versions of Linux in 1991.

The main backbone connections have gradually been upgraded to optical fiber since 2008. First 100 Gbit/s connections were put in production in 2015. FUNET is connected to other research networks through NORDUnet, and to other Finnish Internet service providers via three FICIX points.

== See also ==
- NORDUnet
- GEANT
