= DXing =

Hobby of receiving distant radio or TV stations

DXing, taken from DX, the telegraphic shorthand for "distance" or "distant", is the hobby of receiving and identifying distant radio or television signals, or making two-way radio contact with distant stations in amateur radio, citizens band radio or other two-way radio communications. Many DXers also attempt to obtain written verifications of reception or contact, sometimes referred to as "QSLs" or "veries".

The practice of DXing arose during the early days of radio broadcasting. Listeners would mail "reception reports" to radio broadcasting stations in hopes of getting a written acknowledgement or a QSL card that served to officially verify they had heard a distant station. Collecting these cards became popular with radio listeners in the 1920s and 1930s, and reception reports were often used by early broadcasters to gauge the effectiveness of their transmissions. Although international shortwave broadcasts are on the decline, DXing remains popular among dedicated shortwave listeners. The pursuit of two-way contact between distant amateur radio operators is also a significant activity within the amateur radio hobby.

== Types ==
=== AM radio DX ===
Early radio listeners, often using home made crystal sets and long wire antennas, found radio stations few and far between. With the broadcast bands uncrowded, signals of the most powerful stations could be heard over hundreds of miles, but weaker signals required more precise tuning or better receiving gear.

By the 1950s, and continuing through the mid-1970s, many of the most powerful North American "clear channel" stations such as KDKA, WLW, WGY, CKLW, CHUM, WABC, WJR, WLS, WKBW, KFI, KAAY, KSL and a host of border blasters from Mexico pumped out Top 40 music played by popular disc jockeys. As most smaller, local AM radio stations had to sign off at night, the big 50 kW stations were able to reach listeners hundreds of miles away.

The popularity of DXing the medium-wave band has diminished as the popular music formats quickly migrated to the clearer, though less propagating, FM radio beginning in the 1970s. Meanwhile, the MW band in the United States was getting more and more crowded with new stations and existing stations receiving FCC authorization to operate, with low power, at night—this largely peaked in the conservative talk radio boom of the 1990s, and especially since the 2010s, the AM band has gone into decline. In Canada, the decline came sooner as AM stations began moving to FM beginning in the 1980s and continuing through today. A limited number of music stations, including WSM in the United States, CFZM in Canada and—on weekends—WABC still program music on their clear-channel signals.

Outside of the Americas and Australia, most AM radio broadcasting was in the form of synchronous networks of government-operated stations, operating with hundreds, even thousands of kilowatts of power. Still, the lower powered stations and occasional trans-oceanic signal were popular DX targets.

=== Shortwave DX ===
Especially during wartime and times of conflict, reception of international broadcasters, whose signals propagate around the world on the shortwave bands, has been popular with both casual listeners and DXing hobbyists.

With the rise in popularity of streaming audio over the internet, many international broadcasters (including the BBC and Voice of America) have cut back on their shortwave broadcasts. Missionary religious broadcasters still make extensive use of shortwave radio to reach less developed countries around the world.

In addition to international broadcasters, the shortwave bands also are home to military communications, RTTY, amateur radio, pirate radio, and broadcasts of numbers stations. Many of these signals are transmitted in single side band mode, which requires the use of specialized receivers more suitable to DXing than to casual listening.

=== VHF DXing ===
Though sporadic in nature, signals on the FM broadcast and VHF television bands – especially those stations at the lower end of these bands – can "skip" for hundreds, even thousands of miles. North American FM stations have been received in Western Europe, and European TV signals have been received on the West Coast of the U.S.

Police, fire, and military communications on the VHF bands are also DX'ed to some extent on multi-band radio scanners, though they are mainly listened to strictly on a local basis. One difficulty is in identifying the exact origins of communications of this nature, as opposed to commercial broadcasters which must identify themselves at the top of each hour, and can often be identified through mentions of sponsors, slogans, etc. throughout their programming.

=== Amateur radio DX ===
Amateur radio operators who specialize in making two way radio contact with other amateurs in distant countries are also referred to as "DXers". On the HF (also known as shortwave) amateur bands, DX stations are those in foreign countries. On the VHF/UHF amateur bands, DX stations can be within the same country or continent, since making a long-distance VHF contact, without the help of a satellite, can be very difficult. DXers collect QSL cards as proof of contact and can earn special certificates and awards from amateur radio organizations.

In addition, many clubs offer awards for communicating with a certain number of DX stations. For example, the ARRL offers the DX Century Club award, or DXCC. The basic certificate is awarded for working and confirming at least 100 entities on the ARRL DXCC List. For award purposes, entities/areas other than nation-states (countries) can be classified as "DX countries". For example, the French territory of Reunion Island in the Indian Ocean is counted as a DX country, even though it is a region of France. The rules for determining what is a DX country can be quite complex and to avoid potential confusion, radio amateurs often use the term entity instead of country. In addition to entities, some awards are based on island groups in the world's oceans. On the VHF/UHF bands, many radio amateurs pursue awards based on Maidenhead grid locators.

In order to give other amateurs a chance to confirm contacts at new or exotic locations, amateurs have mounted DXpeditions to countries or regions that have no permanent base of amateur radio operators. There are also frequent contests where radio amateurs operate their stations on certain dates for a fixed period of time to try to communicate with as many DX stations as possible.

== DX clubs ==
Many radio enthusiasts are members of DX clubs in many countries around the world. The clubs are a useful source of information about news relating to international radio, as well as an opportunity to socialize. One example is the British DX Club.

== QSL cards ==
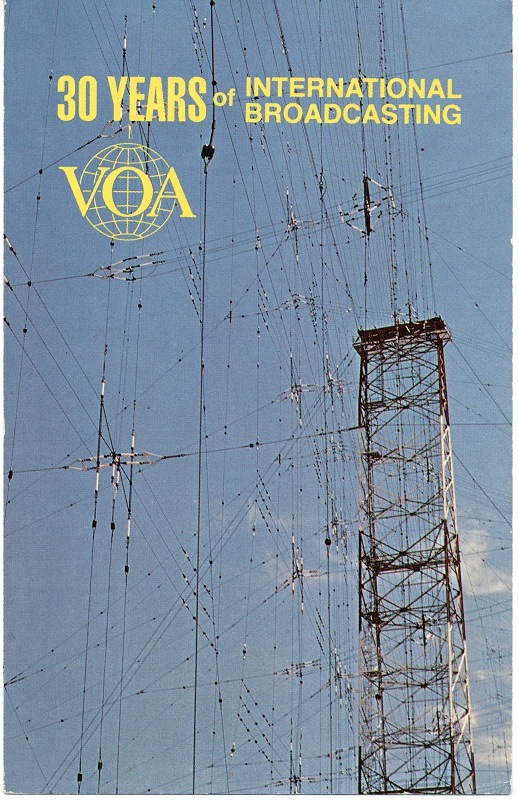
QSL card from Voice of America

A number of DXers collect acknowledgement cards called QSL cards. QSL cards often have a picture and messages indicating their country's culture or technological life on one side, and confirmation of the listeners reception data on the other.

== SINPO report ==
SINPO is a code used to indicate reception quality in each of five attributes, graded on a scale of 1 to 5, where '1' means the quality was very bad and '5' very good. The attributes are:

S – Signal strength
I – Interference with other stations or broadcasters
N – Noise ratio in the received signal
P – Propagation (ups and downs of the reception)
O – Overall merit

Reports are sent by post or email, and may include the listeners geographical location in longitude and latitude, the types of receiver and antennae used, the frequency the transmission was heard on, a brief description of the programme listened to, their opinion about it, and suggestions if any.

Although the SINPO code is a subjective measure, a particular broadcast may receive SINPO reports from several listeners from the same area, allowing the broadcaster to compare reports and gain insight into signal coverage.

Variants of this report are: a) the SIO report which omits the Noise and Propagation, b) grading on a scale of 1 to 3 (instead of 1 to 5) and c) the SINFO report where the F stands for fading.

== DX communication ==
DX communication is communication over large or relatively uncommon distances. On the UHF or VHF bands which are typically used for short range or line of sight communications, DX may represent communication with stations 50 or 100 miles away. The UHF and microwave bands have also been used to accomplish Earth–Moon–Earth communication between stations worldwide. On the low frequency bands (30 Hz to 30 kHz), contacts between stations separated by more than 100 miles are often considered DX, but in amateur radio on the high-frequency bands, DX is referred to as stations outside of the receiver's country (see the section, Amateur radio DX).

Among amateur radio operators and shortwave listeners, most traditional DX communication occurs on the HF bands, where the ionosphere is used to refract the transmitted radio beam. The beam returns to the Earth's surface, and may then be reflected back into the ionosphere for a second bounce. Ionospheric refraction is generally only feasible for frequencies below about 50 MHz, and is highly dependent upon atmospheric conditions, the time of day, and the eleven-year sunspot cycle. It is also affected by solar storms and some other solar events, which can alter the Earth's ionosphere by ejecting a shower of charged particles.

The angle of refraction places a minimum on the distance at which the refracted beam will first return to Earth. This distance decreases with frequency. As a result, any station employing DX will be surrounded by an annular dead zone where they can't hear other stations or be heard by them.

This is the phenomenon that allows short wave radio reception to occur beyond the limits of line of sight. It is utilized by amateur radio enthusiasts (hams), shortwave broadcast stations (such as BBC and Voice of America) and others, and is what allows one to hear AM (MW) stations from areas far from their location. It is one of the backups to failure of long-distance communication by satellites, when their operation is affected by electromagnetic storms from the sun.

For example, in clear ionosphere conditions, one can hear France Inter on 711 kHz, far into the UK and as far as Reading, Berkshire. It is also possible to hear Radio Australia from Melbourne as far away as Lansing, Michigan, a distance of some 9,835 miles (15,827 kilometers).

== DXing equipment ==
Equipment used in DXing ranges from inexpensive portable receivers to deluxe equipment costing thousands of dollars. Using just a simple AM radio, one can easily hear signals from the most powerful stations propagating hundreds of miles at night. Car radios are also used for DXing the AM broadcast bands.

Inexpensive shortwave radio receivers can receive signals emanating from several countries during any time of day. Serious hobbyists use more elaborate receivers designed specifically for pulling in distant signals, and often build their own antennas designed for a specific frequency band. In general, an inexpensive desktop or "PC Radio" will be able to "hear" just about what a very expensive high-performance receiver can receive. The difference between the two types is that the expensive receiver will have more filtering options and usually better adjacent channel interference blocking, sometimes resulting in the difference of being able to receive or not receive a signal under poor conditions.

Many simple wire antennas can be made inexpensively. Having two dipole antennas at right angles to each other (for example, one running north–south and one running east–west) can produce dramatically different reception patterns.

== See also ==
- Shortwave listening
