= Weisbecker =

Weisbecker, Weißbecker or Weissbecker is a German surname. Notable people with the surname include:

- Allan Weisbecker (1948–2023), American novelist
- Dmitry Weisbecker-Ivanov (born 1970), Russian poet
- Joseph Weisbecker (1932-1990), designer of the RCA 1802 microprocessor, which has been called "the grandfather of RISC"
- Joyce Weisbecker (born 1958), the first female commercial video game designer
- Laura Weissbecker (born 1984), French actress
- Tommy Weissbecker (1949–1972), German militant

== See also ==
- Wesbecker
