= COSMAC =

COSMAC may refer to:

- The RCA (CDP)1802 microprocessor, aka RCA COSMAC
- The COSMAC Elf an RCA COSMAC microprocessor–based computer released 1976, sold as a kit
- The COSMAC VIP an RCA COSMAC microprocessor–based computer aimed at video games, released 1977, sold as a kit

== See also ==
- CosMc's, a spin-off of McDonald's
