= Joseph Weisbecker =

Researcher

- Born: Joseph A. Weisbecker; September 4, 1932
- Died: November 15, 1990 (aged 58)
- Occupation: Researcher
- Known for: Microprocessors

Joseph A. Weisbecker (September 4, 1932 – November 15, 1990) was an early microprocessor and microcomputer designer and researcher, as well and designer of toys and games. He was a recipient of the David Sarnoff award for outstanding technical achievement, recipient of IEEE Computer magazine's "Best Paper" award, as well as several RCA lab awards for his work.

His designs include the RCA 1800 and 1802 processors, the 1861 "Pixie" graphics chip, the RCA Microtutor, the COSMAC Elf, RCA Studio II, and COSMAC VIP computers. His daughter Joyce Weisbecker took to programming his prototypes, becoming the first female video game designer in the process, using his language called CHIP-8.

== Early career ==
Professionally, Weisbecker began working with digital logic and computer systems in 1951. It was also his hobby, however, and even his early work is marked by designs that are intended for educational or hobbyist use. These include a hobby tic-tac-toe computer built from relays in 1951, grade school educational aids built using lights and switches in 1955, and the Think-a-Dot, an inexpensive game to teach basic computer concepts in 1964. As a staff engineer at RCA, he performed advanced development research on LSI circuits as well as development of new product lines based on those circuits and other RCA products.

== Microprocessors ==
In 1970 and 1971, Weisbecker developed a new 8-bit architecture computer system. This work preceded the release of the 4004 by competitor Intel. He built a demonstration home computer run by the 1802 called FRED (Flexible Recreational and Educational Device) that utilized cassette tape for storage and a television for display. Subsequent to the success of the 4004, RCA released Weisbecker's work as the COSMAC 1801R and 1801U using its CMOS process in 1975. In 1976 the two 1801 ICs were integrated into a single chip, the 1802.

In the time between 1971 and the production release of the 1800 series processor, Weisbecker developed a range of inexpensive application circuits for use with the 1800s, including light guns, card readers, and cassette interfaces. Several of these circuits were used in a demonstration model microprocessor-based electronic game system which anticipated home video games. The commercial promise of this system gave RCA the motivation they required to produce the 1800 series processors.

Weisbecker designed the 1861 PIXIE graphics processor in 1975 as a minimal-cost simple video output for microcomputer systems. In a single chip, it provided all the functions necessary for a bit-mapped graphic display.

== Small systems ==
During this same time (1975), Weisbecker developed an educational "development board" or "trainer" style single board computer, the RCA Microtutor, to teach basic computer concepts and programming. He also designed the production form of the home video game system, which became the RCA Studio II.

In 1976 Popular Electronics published Weisbecker' design for the COSMAC Elf, a close relative to the Microtutor designed to be built at home by a hobbyist with no special computer resources. In 1977 further articles added 1861-based video to the Elf, similar to the Studio II, as well as additional memory and rudimentary operating systems.

In 1976, RCA released the COSMAC VIP, Which expanded on the features of the ELF, and is for the system which Weisbecker had created the CHIP-8 interpreted programming language. CHIP-8 is a very small high level language designed for easy keyboard and video interaction. CHIP-8 is still used by some communities, such as on graphing calculators like TI-83 series. and has had interpreters created for many modern and older systems. He later developed color graphic chips for use in a more advanced video game with expansion capabilities, as well as a line of color graphic terminals. Products using these included the Studio III.

== Writings ==
Along with the hardware and software development of the systems he designed, Weisbecker wrote detailed manuals, use guides, and tutorials for each. He had a commitment to fun and inexpensive computer systems. Titles such as "Fun and Games with COSMAC" (IEEE Electro #77, April 1977) and "An Easy Programming System" (Byte, December 1978) demonstrate this, as do the contents of his many papers, manuals, and articles.

== Legacy ==
The COSMAC Elf continues to be a popular educational microcomputer construction project to the present time, and several newer designs have been based on it.

The design principles of the 1802—large, general purpose register file and a limited set of instructions that execute in few cycles—presaged the RISC design philosophy. The 1802 has been called "the grandfather of RISC".

The 1802's load mode is unique, and along with RCA's radiation-hardened silicon on sapphire process was instrumental in the selection of the 1802 processor for several space probes and space-based instruments. Some of these processors are still working in their third decade in space. The 1802 is unique among first generation processors in that it is still in production today. Its closest rival in this respect is the 8080A, the successor to the 8080 and 8008 designs from Intel.
