= 1802 (disambiguation) =

1802 was a year of the Gregorian and Julian calendar.

1802 may also refer to:

- BMW 1802, a car model
- RCA 1802, a microprocessor
