= COSMAC VIP =

1977 microcomputer

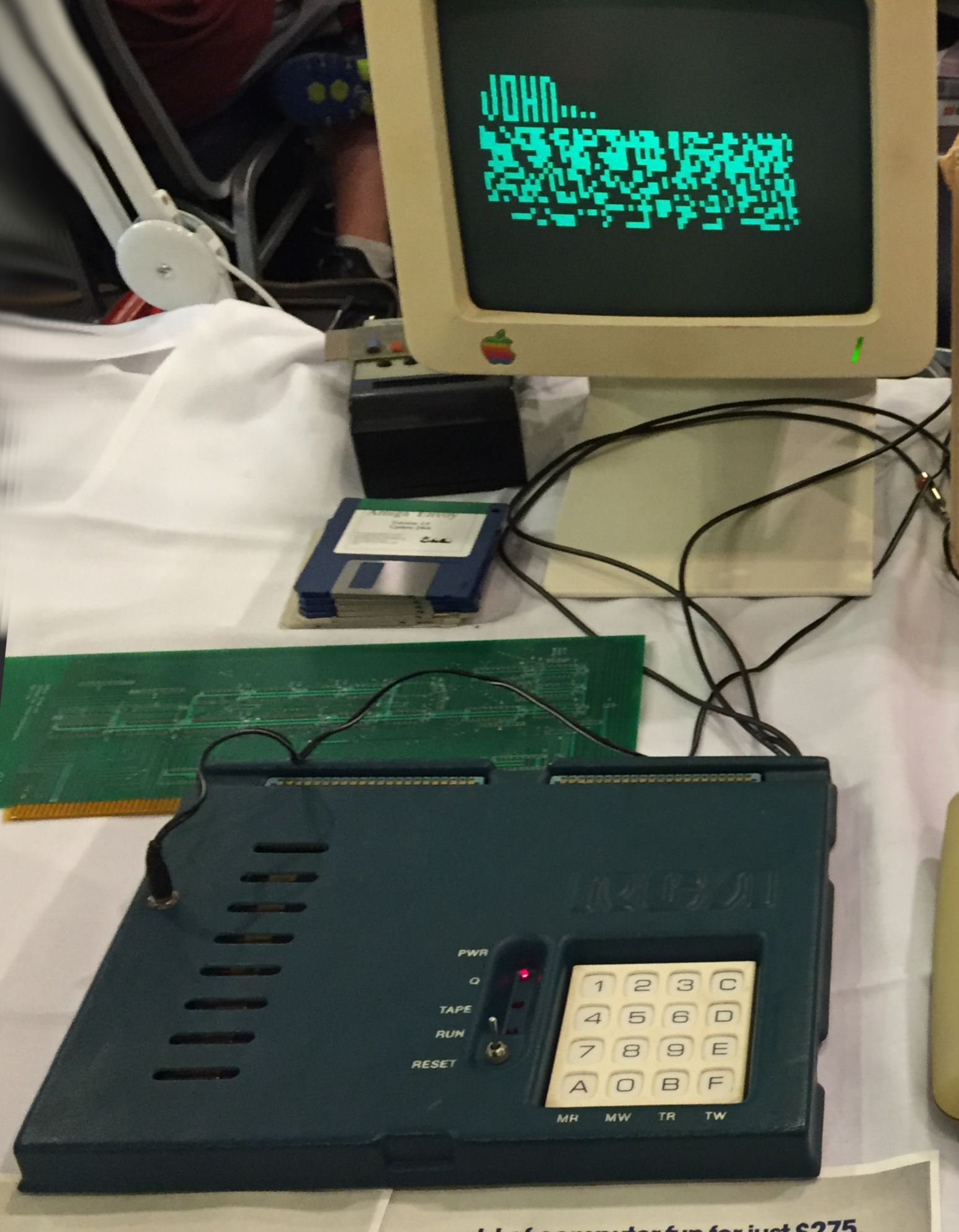
- RCA COSMAC VIP CDP18S711
- Developer: Joseph Weisbecker
- Manufacturer: RCA
- Type: microcomputer
- Released: 1977; 49 years ago
- Introductory price: US$275 (Kit)
- Operating system: 512-bytes in ROM
- CPU: RCA 1802 processor
- Memory: 2 KB RAM (Expandable to 4 KB on board, and 32 KB via an expansion slot)
- Storage: Compact Cassette
- Display: CDP1861/CDP1864 video display chip 64 × 128 px
- Sound: speaker
- Power: 5V DC CDP18S023 power supply @ 600 mA

The COSMAC VIP (1977) was an early microcomputer that was aimed at video games. Essentially, it was a COSMAC Elf with a supplementary CDP1861/CDP1864 video display chip. For a price of US$275, it could be purchased from RCA by mail order. It came in kit form, and had to be assembled. Its dimensions were 22 × 28 cm, and it had an RCA 1802 processor; along with a crystal clock operating at 1.76 MHz. (Note: The clock speed of many early microcomputers was derived from the base NTSC color burst frequency of 3.5795 MHz (315M/88), using a common TV crystal at that frequency or a simple multiple, obtaining e.g. the 1.79 MHz used in many 6502-based machines, reducing costs and simplifying production of colour graphics. The VIP is somewhat unique in not using a standard NTSC crystal, but a slight deviation to 1.76064 MHz, in order to match the even simpler-than-usual timing of the extremely cheap, but also extremely rudimentary "Pixie" video generator chip with the TV signal (as per its contemporaries, a single synchronised clock ran the entire system). It also, for reasons best known to the COSMAC designers, prefers a strict adherence to the 60.00 Hz field timing of interlaced, monochrome 525-line televisions and monitors, even though the system's progressive frame-scan thus enforced a line rate of 15.72 kHz, somewhat lower than both the monochrome and color TV standards. Possibly they mistook the nominal rates of the standard as being maxima - a mistake exposed by most other early computers producing eminently TV-compatible signals of approximately, and often somewhat higher than the nominal color 59.94 Hz and 15.734 kHz, using standard NTSC crystals and not much more complex circuitry.) It had 2 KB (2048 bytes) of RAM, which could be expanded to 4 KB on board, and 32 KB via an expansion slot. Its 5V DC CDP18S023 power supply had an output of 600 mA. I/O ports could be added to connect to sensors, interface relays, an ASCII keyboard, or a printer.

The machine connected to either a video monitor or to a TV with video input or by means of an external RF modulator. The VIP used a CDP1861/CDP1864 video display chip to generate the video output, and sound could be played using its integrated speaker. It had a 100 byte-per-second cassette tape interface as well. Programs could be loaded into RAM from tapes, and vice versa. It also had a hex number pad for input, which had 16 keys spanning the hex digits 0 to F. LED indicators were used to display power status and tape input; a third LED along with an on-board beeper were activated by the CPU's 1-bit "Q" register. A run/reset switch was used to start user programs or the operating system, respectively.

A simple 512-byte operating system was built into its ROM. It allowed one to type in programs using its hex keyboard, show memory contents on its display (step through the bytes of RAM), and view the values of the processor registers. The ROM monitor was accessed by holding the "C" key while switching from Reset to Run. The COSMAC VIP was shipped with 20 video games, which were programmed in CHIP-8. CHIP-8 was an early interpreted programming language that was used on this machine and other early microcomputers, such as the Telmac 1800. The video games that were provided came as a list of instructions that had to be typed in by the user.

The COSMAC VIP was created by Joseph Weisbecker of the RCA Laboratories in New Jersey. His daughter Joyce created some of the games included with it. RCA sold a $39 version of Tiny BASIC on an expansion board.

A VIP II version was designed, bundling the VIP with several expansion cards and selling it in fully assembled form. Marketing materials from 1979 refer to a 1980 release, but this never occurred. Several years later the VIP II was equipped with a ROM containing a terminal program and sold as a portable terminal device under the name RCA VP 3000.
