= COSMAC Elf =

Early single-board personal computer

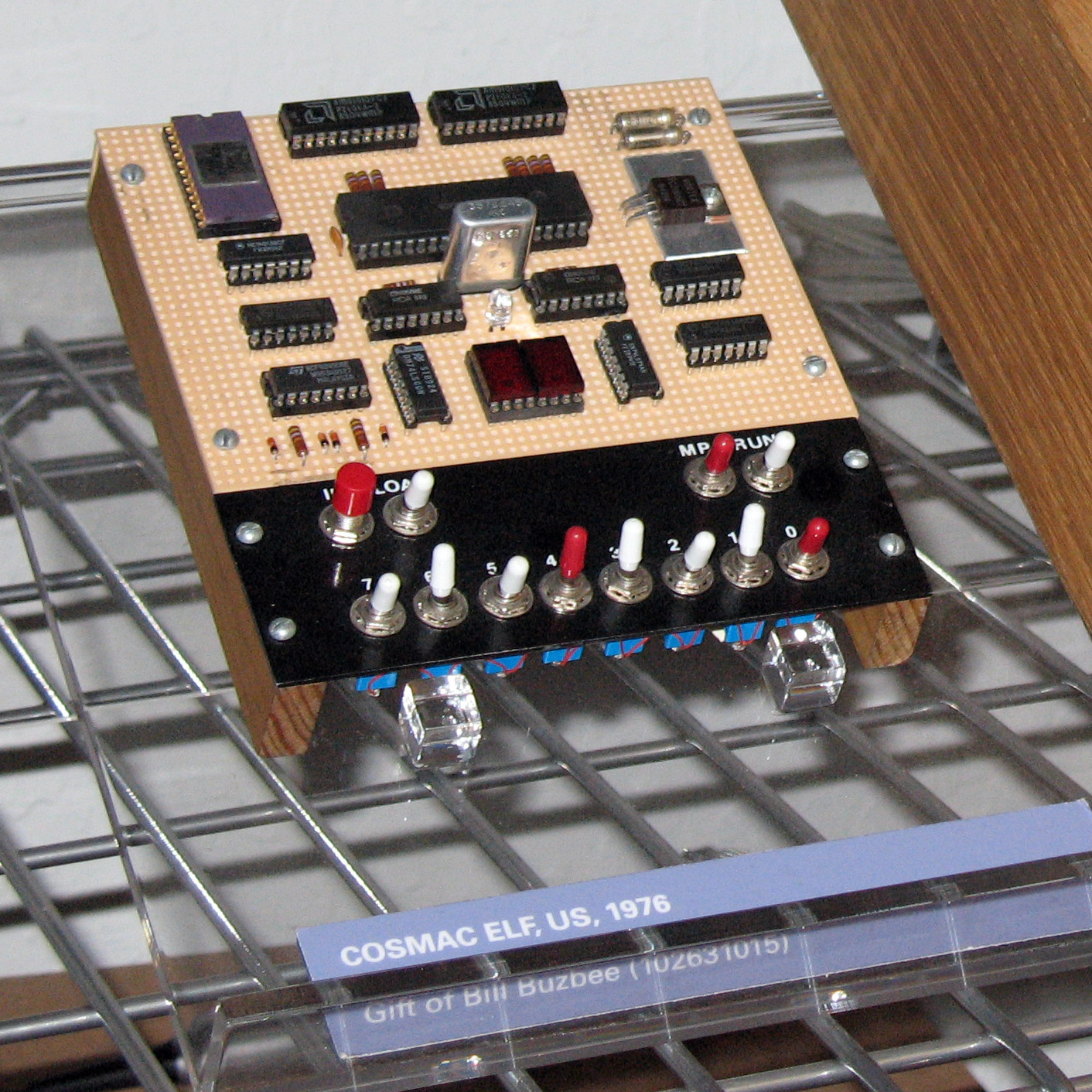
- COSMAC Elf with Pixie Graphics Display
- Manufacturer: RCA
- Released: 1976; 50 years ago
- CPU: RCA 1802
- Memory: 256 bytes of RAM; expandable
- Graphics: RCA CDP1861
- Sound: Beeper
- Predecessor: FRED / System 00
- Successor: COSMAC VIP

The COSMAC Elf is an early single-board personal computer based on the RCA 1802 microprocessor. It was originally described in a series of construction articles in Popular Electronics magazine in 1976 and 1977. The system operated without read-only memory (ROM) chips—programs were entered directly into RAM memory using the 1802's integrated direct memory access (DMA), 8 toggle switches, and an Input push button. An updated commercial version called the COSMAC VIP was later sold in kit form.

== Description ==
The original Elf featured two hexadecimal LED displays for byte data value output, and a set of 8 toggle switches for input (a hexadecimal keypad was an optional extension). The base configuration had 256 bytes of RAM, but expansion projects could raise that to a power of two-based memory store, with an upper limit of 64K address space.

The first Elf design used a crystal with a frequency in the range of 1 to 2 MHz with the 1802's built in oscillator circuit.

A simple circuit used the DMA feature of the 1802 to permit entry of programs and data into RAM through the toggle switches. Entering a byte via the toggle switches and pressing the "input" button would enter a byte into RAM and display it on the pair of hex LEDs, then advance the DMA counter to the next location. A "memory protect" switch could be used to disable memory alteration. If an error was made in program entry, it could be corrected by turning on memory protect, turning off load mode (thus resetting the program counter to zero), turning on load mode, and pressing "input" to advance to the address of the incorrect data. After turning off memory protect, the correct value could be entered.

The fourth article of the series presented modifications to use a companion RCA 1861 “Pixie” video generator IC (CDP1861). The Pixie required a 1.76 MHz clock, and since that was an uncommon crystal frequency, usually a readily available 3.579545 MHz color burst crystal was instead used in a separate oscillator circuit with a divide-by-two circuit to drive the clock inputs of both the microprocessor and Pixie. The resulting 1.7897725 MHz clock was close enough for the hardware to work. Monochrome video output (with timing roughly approximating NTSC standard) could be generated using DMA operations interleaved with carefully arranged 1802 opcodes as instructions in software. The maximum resolution of the 1861 was 64h by 128v rectangular pixels. By changing the placement of instructions in the video display control and interrupt routines, pixel rows could be repeated to obtain lower resolutions, allowing the video display to be used with 256 bytes of RAM (64×32 square pixels).

A one-bit output from the microprocessor, the Q line, could be driven by software to produce sounds through an attached speaker, to save programs in RAM to a cassette recorder, and for serial I/O output. Branch instructions in the 1802 instruction set could read the state of the EF1 through EF4 single bit value input lines, which were used to read the 'I' keypad (input) momentary pushbutton (typically EF4), programs from the cassette recorder through interface circuitry, serial I/O input, and input from peripherals such as a light pen. There are also seven 8-bit I/O ports available for decoding and interfacing.

== Microcomputers ==
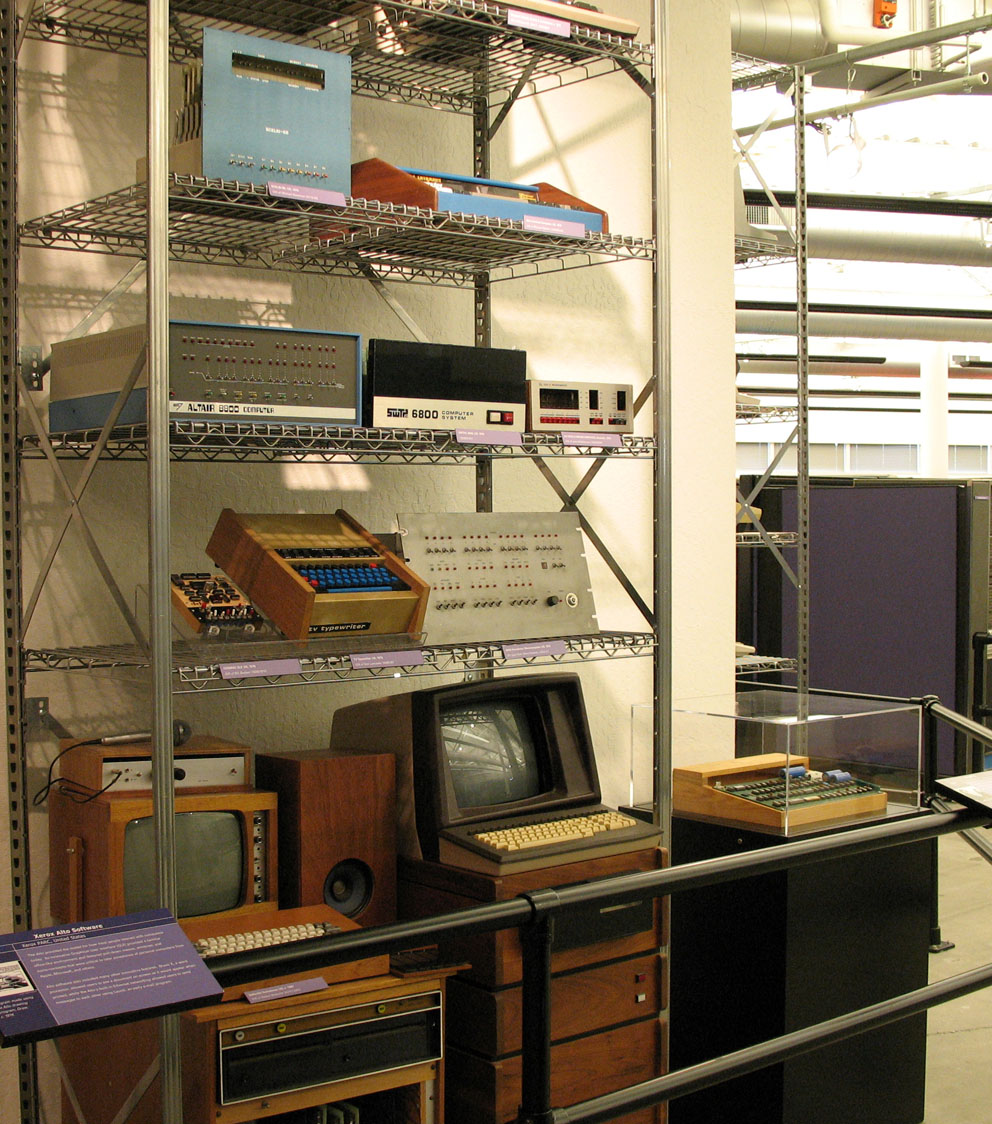
COSMAC Elf on display at the Computer History Museum. (Lower-middle left, below the Altair 8800 computer and next to the TV Typewriter.)

The original Elf computers were essentially home-built versions of the RCA Microkit, Microtutor I and Microtutor II, which were RCA's demonstration boards for their CDP1801 2-chip predecessor and single-chip CDP1802 microprocessors.

Enhanced kits such as the Netronics Elf II and Quest Super Elf added built-in features such as keypads for data entry, serial I/O, cassette interface, and the CDP1861 "Pixie" video chip. RCA later introduced their own similarly expanded version as the COSMAC VIP.

In August 2006, Nuts and Volts magazine, along with Spare Time Gizmos, released a project to build the "Cosmac Elf 2000," based on the original Elf, with some newer and easier to find components and enhanced features, modules, and functionality, including the STG1861 Pixie Graphics Replacement board that is functionally equivalent to the now-rare RCA CDP1861 integrated circuit.

The Membership Card is a modern, simple COSMAC Elf-like remake for retrocomputing hobbyists that is designed to fit in an Altoids tin.

Various other hobbyist systems can be found on the Internet, including hardware emulators using FPGA and modern microcontrollers.

== Software ==
A series of newsletters and small booklets offered by Netronics and Quest contained 1802 machine language and CHIP-8 programs, along with schematics for expanding the Elf and adding peripherals, including a light pen. Other, similar information and hobbyist software projects can be found on the Internet. The only published book about the 1802 is Tom Swan's "Programmer’s Guide to the 1802" (1981), which has been made available as a PDF after being out of print for many years.

Tiny BASIC, a version of BASIC offered by Tom Pittman, could be used to write small BASIC programs on the Elf that could display through the Pixie low-resolution monochrome graphics display or TV-Typewriter hardware. Pittman also wrote a small booklet about the 1802 titled "A Short Course In Programming", which he has allowed to be published and made available online free of charge.

Mike Riley has written an editor, assembler, BASIC and FORTH interpreters, a BIOS, and the Elf/OS disk operating system that will run on expanded Elf systems, including the COSMAC Elf 2000.

Other languages available are noted at the RCA 1802 Wikipedia entry, including interpreters, compilers and assemblers.

Game cartridges for the RCA Studio II contain Chip-8 games, which can run on other 1802 systems. File dumps of these games can be found on the Internet.
