= RCA Studio II =

Home video game consoles by RCA

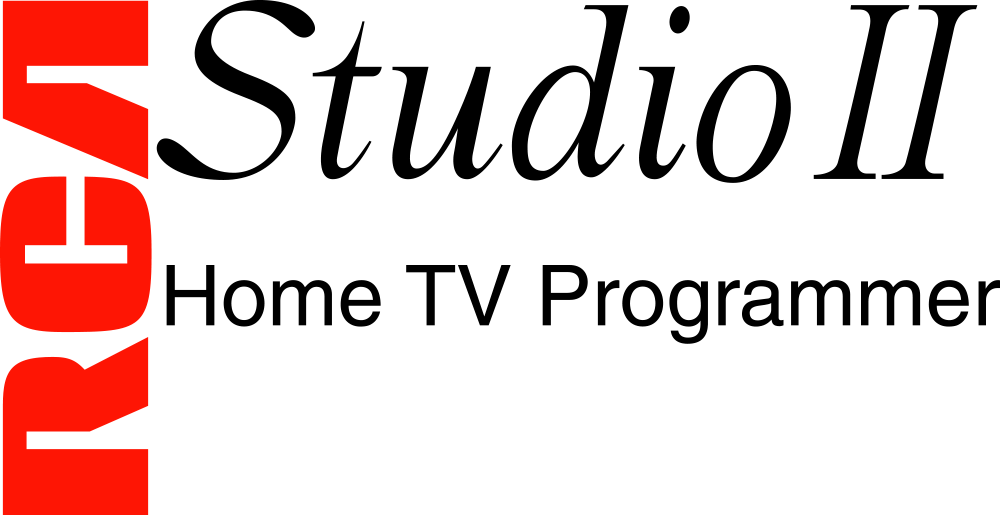

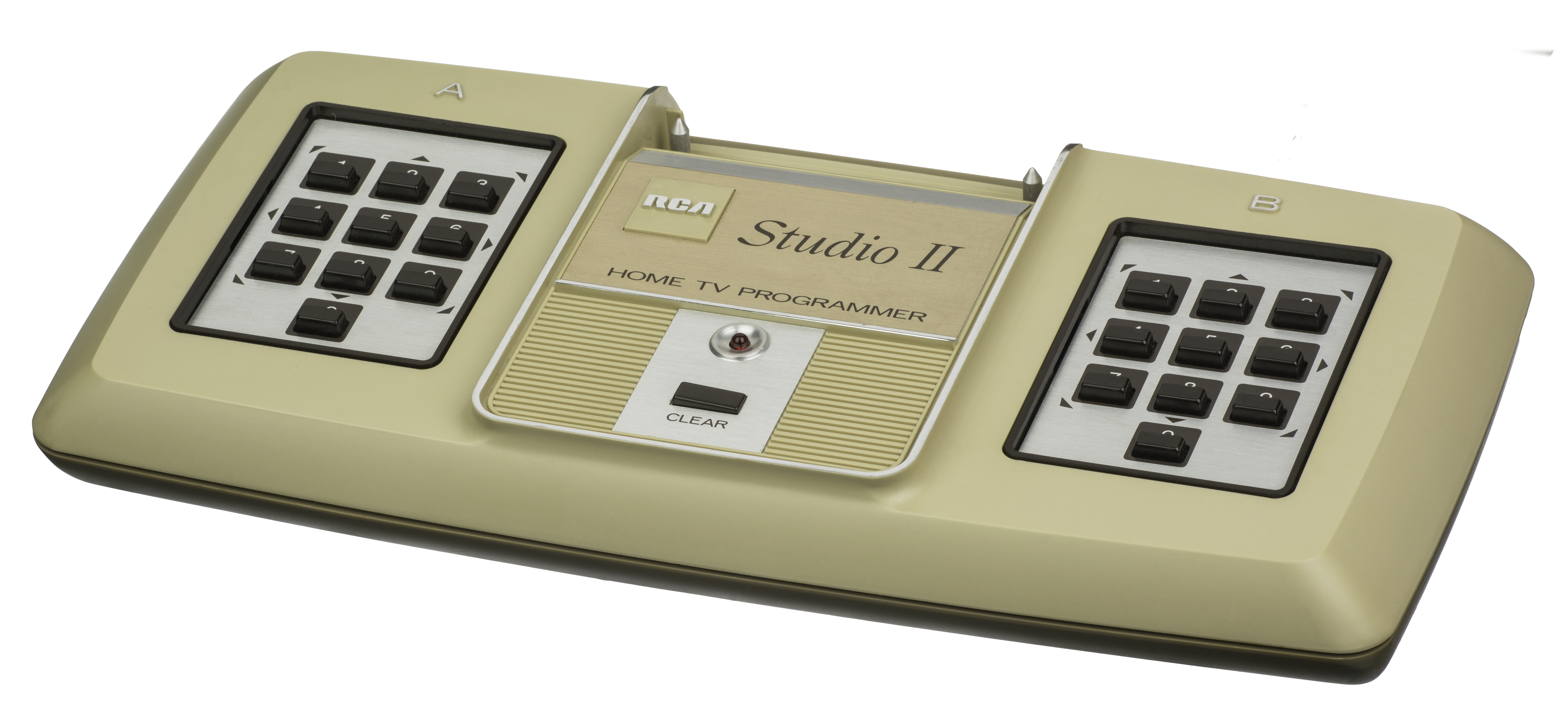
- RCA Studio II
- Manufacturer: RCA
- Type: Home video game console
- Generation: Second generation
- Released: February 1977; 49 years ago
- Introductory price: US$149 (equivalent to $791.64 in 2025)
- Discontinued: 1978
- Units sold: 53,000-64,000
- CPU: RCA 1802 microprocessor, 1.78 MHz
- Memory: 512 bytes (normally used as 256 bytes display RAM + 256 bytes program RAM)
- Removable storage: ROM cartridge
- Display: 64x32, monochrome graphics
- Graphics: RCA CDP1861 "Pixie"
- Controller input: Ten-button keypads

The RCA Studio II is a home video game console made by RCA that debuted in January 1977. The graphics of Studio II games were black and white and resembled those of earlier Pong consoles and their clones. The Studio II also did not have joysticks or similar game controllers but instead used two ten-button keypads that were built into the console itself. The console was capable of making simple beep sounds with slight variations in tone and length. The Studio II included five built-in games.

The Studio II was not a successful product; the previously released Fairchild Channel F made it obsolete at launch and the Atari 2600, superior to both, was released ten months later. After poor Christmas sales in 1977, RCA discontinued the Studio II.

The console was licensed and marketed under other names: Mustang 9016 Telespiel-Computer, Conic M-1200 Micro Computer, Trevi M-1200 Micro Computer, Sheen M-1200 Microcomputer, Toshiba Visicom COM-100, Hanimex MPT-02, Soundic Victory MPT-02 e Academy Apollo 80.

== Development ==
RCA engineer Joseph Weisbecker began building his own personal computer at home in the late 1960s, and encouraged the company to sell small computers. RCA introduced the Studio II video game console—using Weisbecker's COSMAC 1802 CPU—in 1977. It was first put out in limited test markets in four U.S. cities in February, and released nationally later in the year.

Joyce Weisbecker, the daughter of the console's designer, learned how to program her father's homemade home computer as a child. After graduating from high school in 1976, she used her familiarity with the architecture to create School House I and Speedway/Tag for the Studio II, becoming the first woman to develop a commercial video game.

== Market loss ==
The Studio II sold poorly. An internal sales document put RCA's own sales estimate for the console between 53,000 and 64,000 units sold between February 15, 1977, and January 31, 1978. It was released after the superior Fairchild Channel F, and the very successful Atari 2600 also appeared in 1977. RCA announced the console's discontinuation in February 1978 because of low Christmas sales. While losses were not disclosed, the company laid off 120 workers at its plant that produced the system in North Carolina. Some analysts blamed the fact the RCA Studio II's games were in black and white, and could not compete with systems offering color. The remaining inventory was purchased in 1978 by Radio Shack and was sold for $59.95 which included the game unit, the Blackjack game cartridge, the Tennis/Squash game cartridge, and a random third cartridge out of the inventory they acquired.

== Design ==
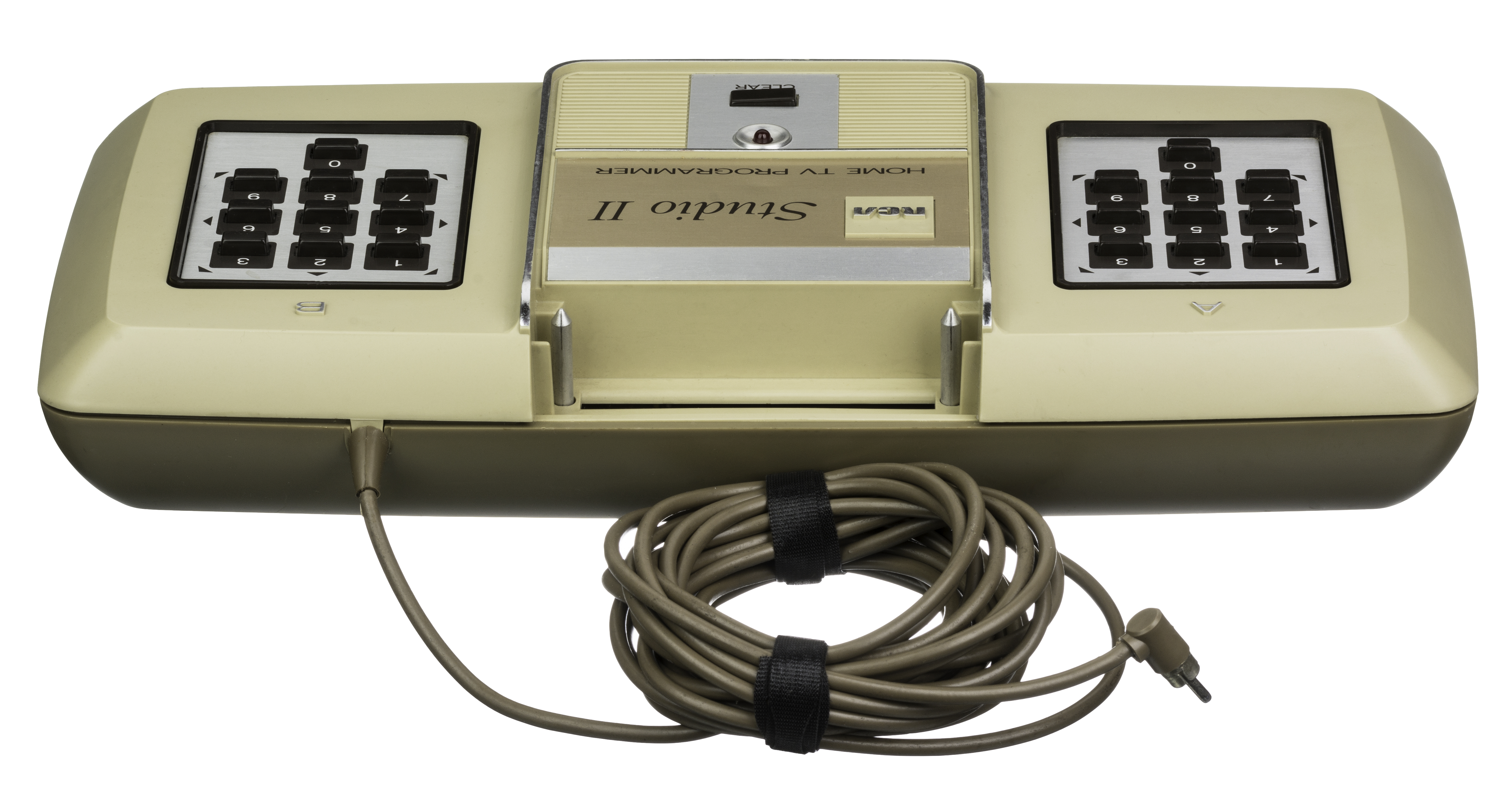
The RCA Studio II from the back. Like the Atari 5200, it uses one cable to carry both video and power for the console.

The Studio II is a home video game console designed around a microprocessor, allowing it to render games on a television screen through software printed on interchangeable cartridges. It was the second console to be designed in this way, following the Fairchild Channel F. The console is composed of a beige and tan plastic shell with gold and silver colored trim and two numerical keypads with ten keys each for user input. These keypads are built directly into the console and cannot be removed. There is a speaker on board that generates variable tone beeps, which can be switched on or off. Video is generated using an radio frequency (RF) cable which sends a signal in the same format as analog television sent over the air. This cable plugs into an RF adapter which then connects to a television's antenna port. This RF adapter also provides power for the system and contains its only power switch. Running power and video signal through the same cable was not a common design among competitors, although it would be used again in the Atari 5200 in 1982. The case also features a cartridge port, a power light, and a "clear" button.

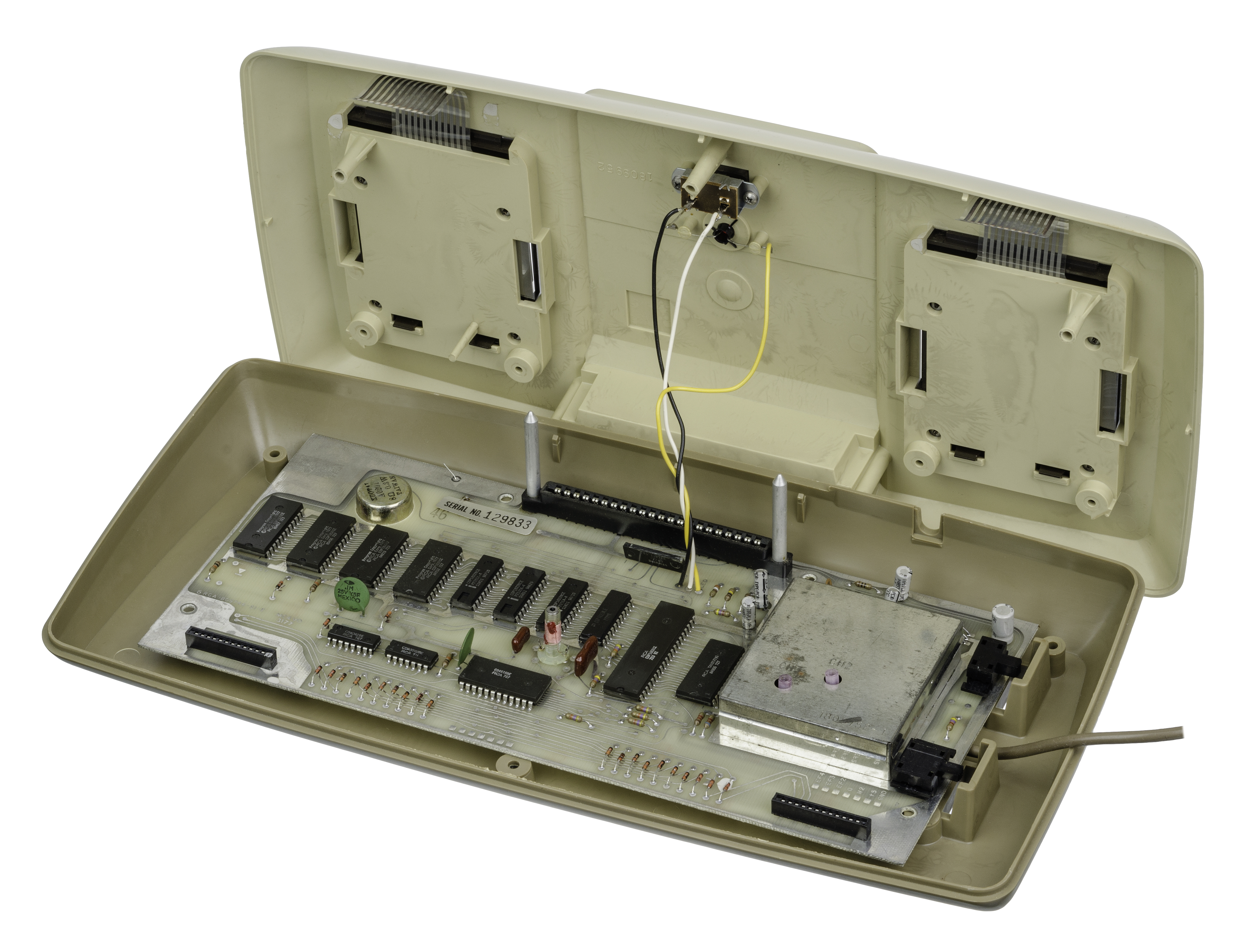
The RCA Studio II used mostly RCA-built chips.

Inside is an RCA 1802, an 8-bit microprocessor designed by RCA engineer Joseph Weisbecker and originally known as the COSMAC. It also has 2 kilobytes of read only memory (ROM), half of which is dedicated five built-in games: Addition, Bowling, Doodle, Freeway, and Patterns. The other half is dedicated to a basic input/output system (BIOS) featuring an interpreter for the custom programming language that cartridges are written in. Graphics are rendered by an RCA CDP1861 video chip, also known as the "PIXIE" graphics system. In this console, the chip was configured to render exclusively black and white squares in a 64 x 32 grid. This requires a 256 byte framebuffer, taking up half of the system's 512 bytes of random access memory (RAM).

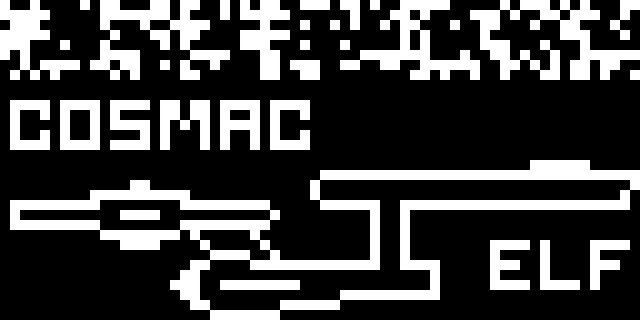
An example of graphics rendered on a Pixie graphics system.

=== Technical specifications ===
- RCA 1802 microprocessor, 1.76 MHz
- 2 KB ROM (includes the five built-in games)
- 512 bytes RAM
- RCA CDP1861 "Pixie" video chip, 64×32, monochrome graphics

== List of games ==
Ten games received a wide release for the system over the course of 1977. Four more games were released for clones of the unreleased Studio III around the world. TV Bingo has been found in the United States but in extremely low quantities. Early games were developed by Joseph Weisbecker and his daughter Joyce Weisbecker. Other games were developed by Phil Baltzer, Andy Modla, and Gooitzen van der Waal.

Cartridge	Game	Release date	MPT-02 (Note: A version of the Studio III by Conic released in France and Australia.)	Description
Built-in	Addition	February 1977		A competition to sum three numbers faster than an opponent.
Built-in	Bowling	February 1977	MG-200	A sports game, based on a simplified version of bowling.
Built-in	Doodle	February 1977	MG-200	A basic drawing program.
Built-in	Freeway	February 1977		A top-down racing game where players drive up screen while avoiding other cars.
Built-in	Patterns	February 1977	MG-200	An graphics program that turns keypad input into visual patterns.
TV Arcade I (18V400)	Space War	February 1977	MG-212	A space themed shooting gallery with two modes. Single-player "Horizontal Interceptor" mode, where guided missiles are shot at passing UFOs, and two-player "Vertical Intercept" mode where cannons fire ricocheting bullets at ascending UFOs.
TV Arcade II (18V401)	Fun with Numbers	February 1977	MG-208	Two simple puzzle games, "Guess the Number", a one or two-player game similar to Mastermind, and "Reverse" where a series of numbers must be arranged in order by reversing groups.
TV School House I (18V500)	Computer Quiz (Note: Title of the MPT-02 version. The original release has no subtitle.)	February 1977	MG-209	A trivia game, where players compete to answer social studies and mathematics questions quickly. Codes appear which are used to reference the full question in the manual.
TV Arcade III (18V402)	Tennis	June 1977	MG-207	A version of Pong with three different paddle sizes and ball speeds.
TV Arcade III (18V402)	Squash	June 1977	MG-207	A single-player version of Pong played against a wall.
TV Arcade IV (18V403)	Baseball	June 1977	MG-210	A sports game, based on baseball, with batters, pitchers, and three outfielders.
TV Arcade Series (18V405)	Gunfighter	September 1977	MG-213	An wild west shoot-out, similar to Midway's Gun Fight.
TV Arcade Series (18V405)	Moonship Battle	September 1977	MG-213	A two-player space game where players attempt to shoot each others spaceships down. Conceptually similar to Spacewar!
TV School House II (18V501)	Math Fun	September 1977	MG-204	A math game where players challenge a computer to solve arithmetic problems.
TV Casino I (18V600)	Blackjack	September 1977	MG-200	A version of the card game blackjack.
TV Arcade Series (18V404)	Speedway	November 1977	MG-211	A competitive racing game where two players race each other around a track.
TV Arcade Series (18V404)	Tag	November 1977	MG-211	A game of tag where players take turns chasing each other.
TV Mystic Series (18V700)	Biorhythm	November 1977	MG-206	A biorhythm calculator, based on a pseudoscientific form of fortune telling.
TV Casino Series (18V601) (Note: Released in very low numbers.)	TV Bingo	1978	MG-201	A version of bingo, the computer presents numbers which can be used to fill out physical bingo cards.
Studio III Only	Concentration Match	1978	MG-202	A version of the memorization based card game concentration.
Studio III Only	Pinball	1978	MG-205	A version of pinball with Pong-like ball physics.
Studio III Only	Star Wars	1978	MG-203	A first-person space shoot 'em up where players aim a reticle at ships resembling TIE fighters. It was not officially licensed by the Star Wars franchise.

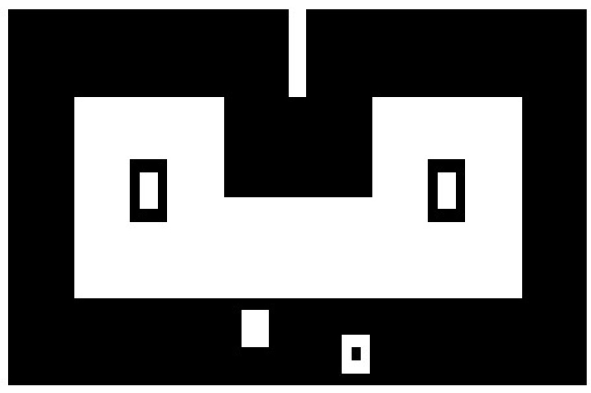
Speedway off of Cartridge 18V404 Speedway/Tag. Players as small white dots race around a track in black from a top-down perspective.

=== Cartridges released on the Visicom COM-100 (Japan) ===
1. CAS-110 Arithmetic drill (Math Fun & Fun with Numbers)
2. CAS-130 Sports fan (Baseball & Sumo Wrestling)
3. CAS-140 Gambler I (Blackjack)
4. CAS-141 Gambler II (Slot Machine and Dice)
5. CAS-160 Space Command (Space War)
6. CAS-190 Inspiration (Bagua, Blood typing and Astrology)

== Legacy ==
The Studio II was followed by the Studio III which can also display color: it was never released due to the failure of Studio II, but was licensed and marketed through its cheap Asian clones. A Studio IV was planned but not created.
