= RCA CDP1861 =

Integrated circuit Video Display Controller

The RCA CDP1861 was an integrated circuit video display controller, released by the RCA in the mid-1970s as a support chip for the RCA 1802 microprocessor. The chip cost in 1977 amounted to less than US$20.

== History ==
The CDP1861 was manufactured in a low-power CMOS technology, came in a 24-pin dual in-line package (DIP), and required a minimum of external components to work. In 1802-based microcomputers, the CDP1861 (for the NTSC video format, CDP1864 variant for PAL), used the 1802's built-in direct memory access controller to display black and white (monochrome) bitmapped graphics on standard TV screens. The CDP1861 was also known as the Pixie graphics system, display, chip, and video generator, especially when used with the COSMAC Elf microcomputer. Other known chip markings for the 1861 are TA10171, TA10171V1 and a TA10171X, which were early designations for "pre-qualification engineering samples" and "preliminary part numbers", although they have been found in production RCA Studio II game consoles and Netronics Elf microcomputers. The CDP1861 was also used in the Telmac 1800 and Oscom Nano microcomputers.

== Specifications ==
The 1861 chip could display 64 pixels horizontally and 128 pixels vertically, though by reloading the 1802's R0 direct memory access register via the required 1802 software controller program and interrupt service routine, the resolution could be reduced to 64×64 or 64×32 to use less memory than the 1024 bytes needed for the highest resolution (with each monochrome pixel occupying one bit) or to display square pixels. A resolution of 64×32 created square pixels and used 256 bytes of memory (2K bits). This was the usual resolution for the CHIP-8 game programming system. Since the video graphics frame buffer was often similar or equal in size to the memory size, it was not unusual to display your program/data on the screen allowing you to watch the computer "think" (i.e. process its data). Programs which ran amok and accidentally overwrote themselves could be spectacular.

The CDP1862 Color Generator Circuit IC, an 1861 companion chip, could be used to generate limited color graphics.

Due to the discontinuation of the 1861 and its rarity, in 2004 a fully functional analogue called the Spare Time Gizmos STG1861 was made for use with the newly designed and produced ELF 2000 (Elf2K) computer. It is made in the form of a small printed circuit board (PCB) with two small programmable logic devices, two simple TTL chips, and a 24-pin DIP connector for mounting in place of the original chip.

== Gallery ==
Example Pixie graphic display imagery

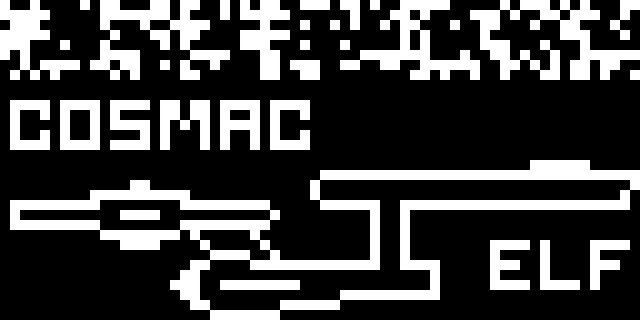
Iconic COSMAC Elf computer Pixie graphics example screen snapshot of Star Trek-like spaceship and program code, via Octo Chip-8 emulator in 64x32 resolution.

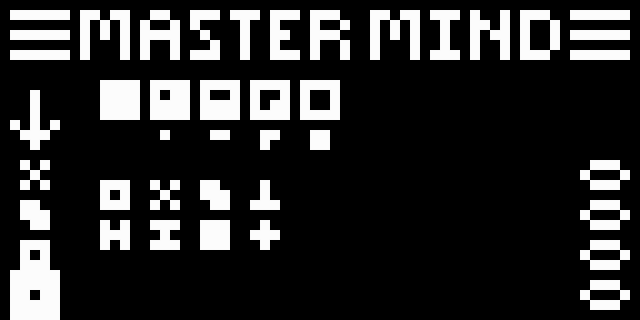
Mastermind game start screen Pixie graphics example snapshot, via Octo Chip-8 emulator in 64x32 resolution.

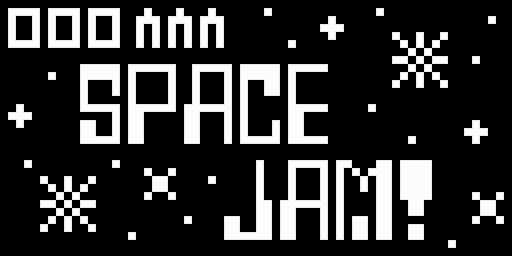
Space Jam! game start screen Pixie graphics example snapshot, via Octo Chip-8 emulator in 64x32 resolution.
