= Nuts and Volts =

American technology magazine

Nuts and Volts is a bimonthly American magazine published by T&L Publications since 1980 covering a broad variety of electronics, circuitry, and robotics technologies, self-described as targeting the "hands-on hobbyist, design engineer, technician, and experimenter" audience. Its subject matter and DIY focus places it in what is often described as maker culture. The magazine is based in Corona, California.

The most recent edition was published as volume 42, issue 6. The volume number corresponds to the 2022 edition, but the last issue does not have a date on its cover.

== History ==
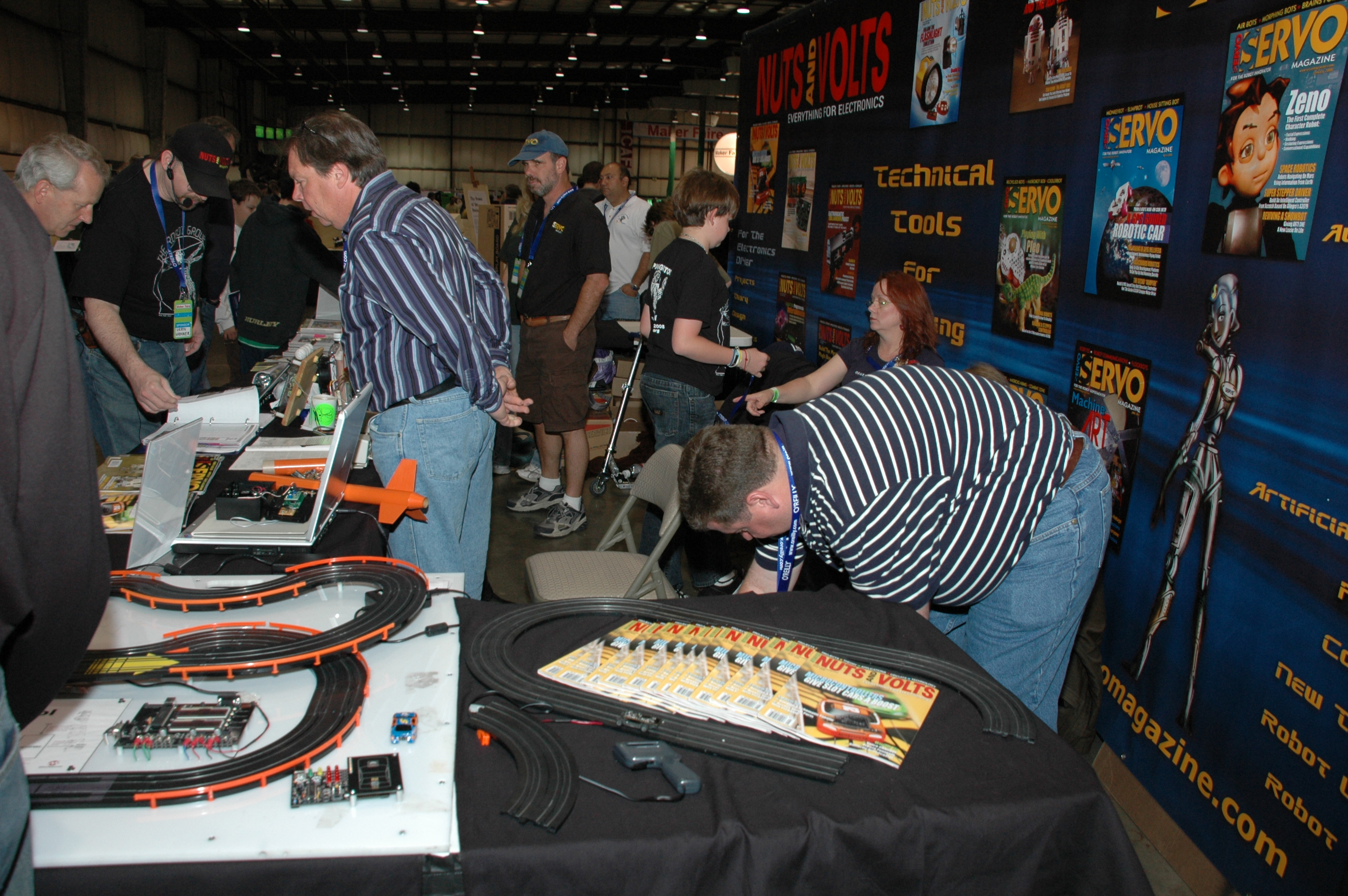
Nuts and Volts booth at Maker Faire 2008

The primary issue of Nuts and Volts was available in 1980. At first it was intended as newsprint, all advertising magazine that was typically distributed for free. The magazine was published on a monthly basis. Over the next few years, the monthly continued to grow in distribution and publicity. However, not much changed until February 1992 when Nuts and Volts changed to a tabloid format and began to make the shift to a more magazine-like format. Editorial features were added along with monthly columns and projects for electronic DIYers. Since then, Nuts and Volts has matured into one of the most well-liked and pertinent magazines for the electronics hobbyist in the United States of America. With the January 2003 issue, Nuts and Volts was reformatted from a tabloid size to a standard magazine size. Nuts and Volts now averages about 100 pages per issue and is printed on gloss paper in full color. As of September 2008, Nuts and Volts reported an average monthly circulation of 44,737 copies. In May 2018, the magazine switched to a bimonthly publication schedule.

Publication was paused in the fall of 2020 and in 2021 during the COVID-19 pandemic, but resumed in 2022. Only three issues were published in 2022, and the three further issues of the 2022 volume were published later. The last edition was issue number 6 of the 2022 edition (volume 42).
