= Joyce Weisbecker =

American engineer and early video game designer

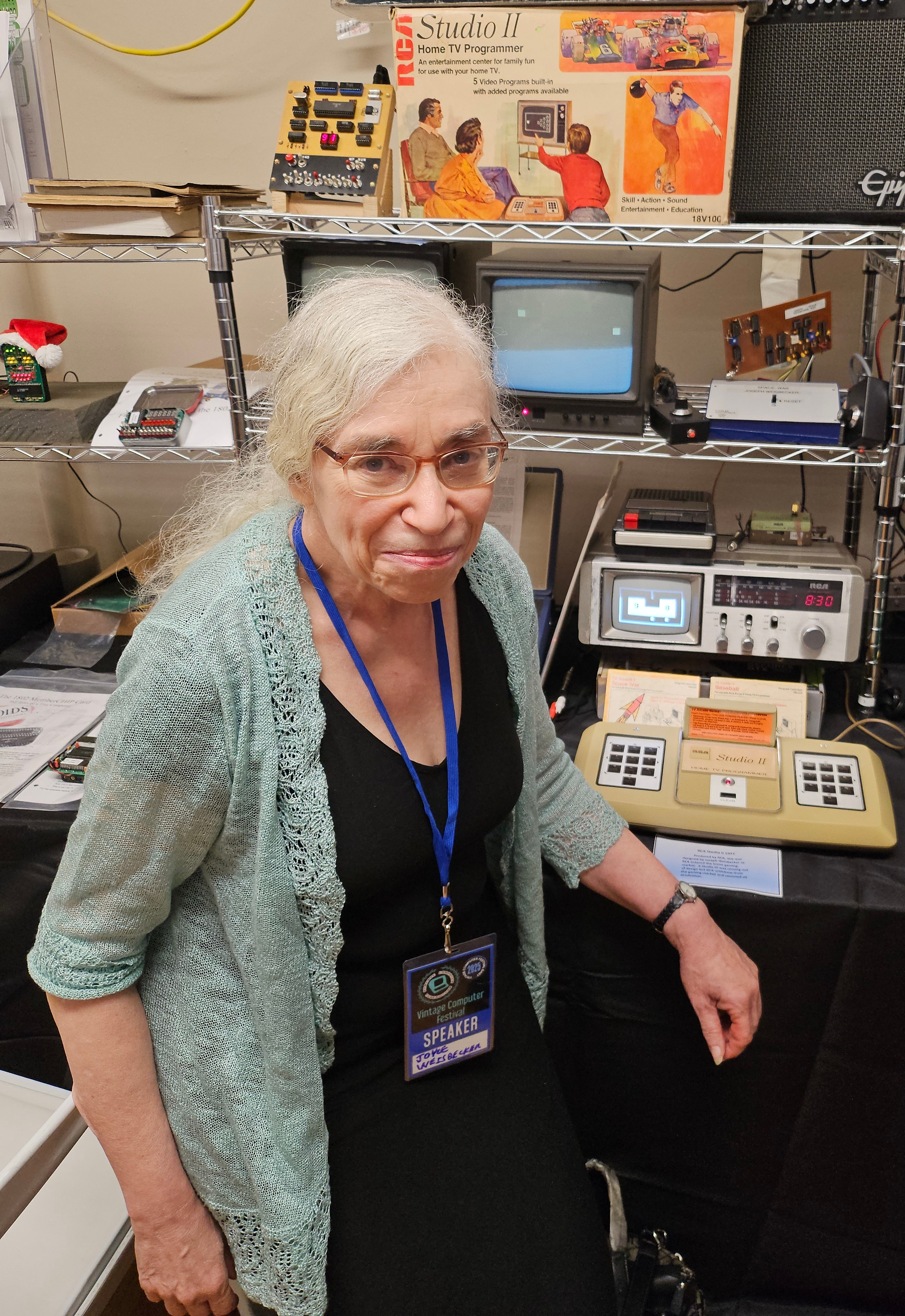
- Joyce Weisbecker with an RCA Studio II from Josh Bensadon at VCF East 2025.
- Born: 1958 (age 67–68)
- Occupation: Video game designer
- Known for: First female commercial video game designer

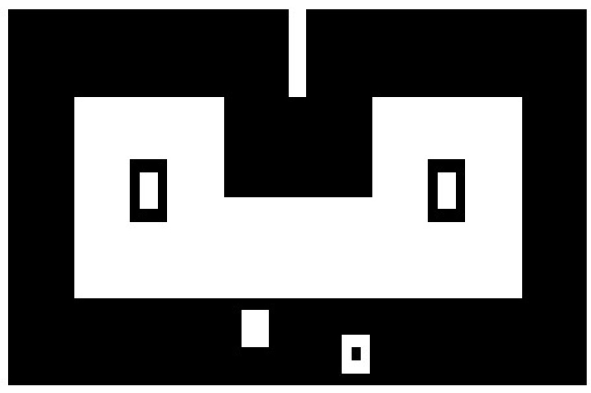
Screenshot of video game Speedway for RCA on COSMAC VIP

Joyce Weisbecker (born 1958) is an American engineer and actuary. She became the first female commercial video game designer in 1976. She considers herself the first indie developer, given that she did her work as an independent contractor.

== Life and career ==
Weisbecker was born in New Jersey as the daughter of Joseph Weisbecker, an engineer with RCA who constructed computers in his spare time. Joyce Weisbecker learned how to program her father's prototypes.

While a student at Rider University, Weisbecker created games for the RCA Studio II console. As demonstration projects she developed two games for the RCA COSMAC VIP, Snake Race and Jackpot. The games were included in the computer's manual as type-in programs in CHIP-8 source code. Weisbecker's first commercial game was TV Schoolhouse I, a quiz game for the RCA II that she programmed in a week in August 1976, and was paid $250 for. In October 1976, she developed Speedway and Tag, two action games. Her main challenge was to get the Studio II's 64 by 32 pixel display to show any meaningful graphics. In the racing game Speedway, the cars were plain rectangles.

The Studio II console was a commercial failure and ended production in 1978. Weisbecker programmed three more games for the COSMAC VIP in 1977 – Slide, Sum Fun, and Sequence Shoot – before deciding to focus on her education instead of continuing to work in the then minuscule video game business. She graduated with degrees in computer engineering and actuarial science in 1980. In 1998, she obtained degrees in electrical engineering and computer science. She has worked as an actuary and radar engineer.

== See also ==
- Carol Shaw – American video game designer
- Wabbit (video game) – 1982 video game
