= RCA 1802 =

Early microprocessor

COSMAC
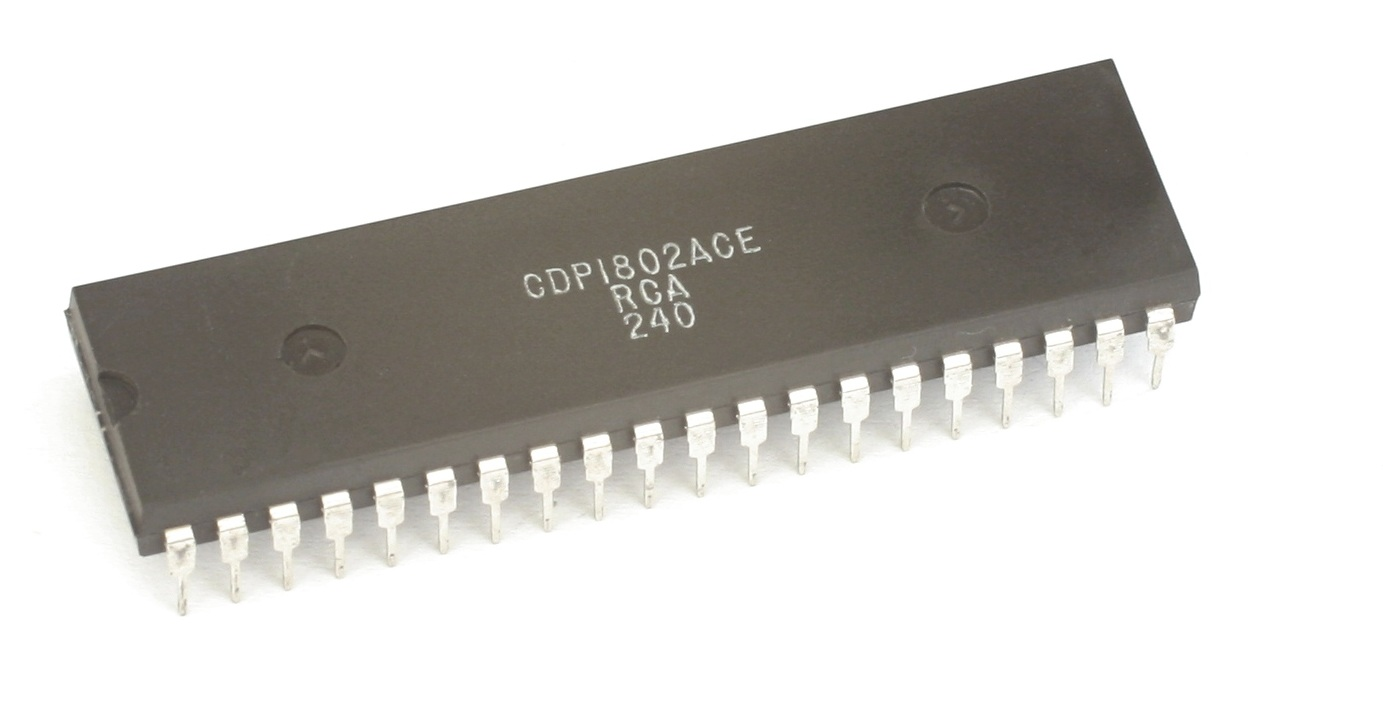
- RCA CDP 1802

General information
- Launched: 1974

Physical specifications
- Package: 40 pin DIP, 44 pin PLCC

History
- Successor: CDP1804, CDP1805, CDP1806

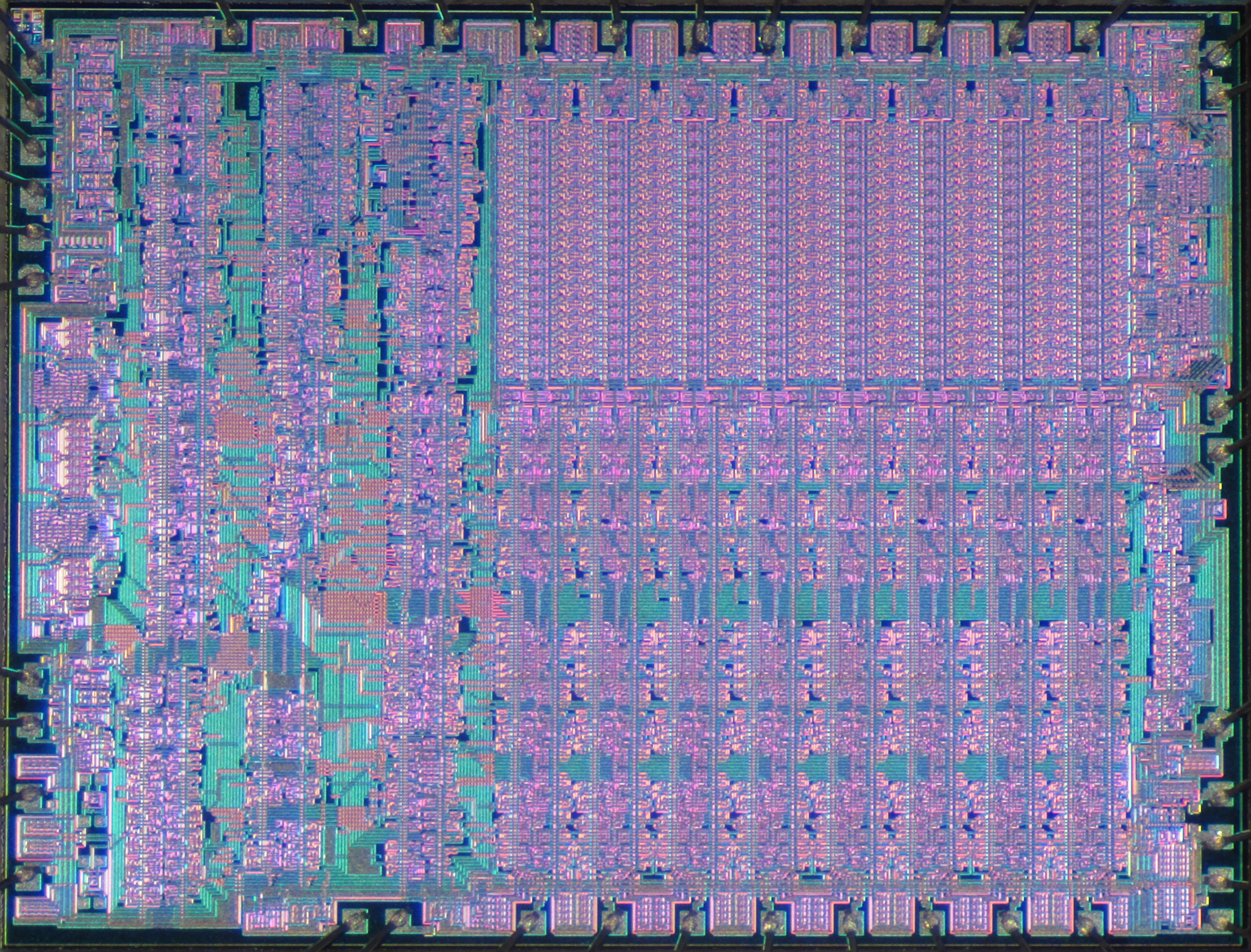
RCA CDP1802 die shot

The COSMAC (Complementary Symmetry Monolithic Array Computer) is an 8-bit microprocessor family introduced by RCA. It is historically notable as the first CMOS microprocessor. The first production model was the two-chip CDP1801R and CDP1801U, which were later combined into the single-chip CDP1802. The 1802 represented the majority of COSMAC production, and today the entire line is known simply as the RCA 1802.

The processor design traces its history to an experimental home computer designed by Joseph Weisbecker in the early 1970s, built at his home using TTL components. RCA began development of the CMOS version of the processor design in 1973, sampling it in 1974 with plans to move to a single-chip implementation immediately. Jerry Herzog led the design of the single-chip version, which sampled in 1975 and entered production in 1976.

In contrast to most designs of the era, which were fabricated using the NMOS process, the COSMAC was implemented in CMOS form and used static logic. This allowed it to run at lower power settings and even be stopped completely; in addition it would run cooler and not generate as much heat as NMOS chips. RCA also produced radiation hardened versions, which found use in the aerospace field. These remain in production as of 2022, and as of 2008 continued to be produced by Renesas (formerly Intersil).

Successors to the 1802 are the CDP1804, CDP1805, and CDP1806, which have an extended instruction set, other enhanced features (like on-chip RAM and ROM, and built-in timer), with some versions running at faster clock speeds, though not a significant speed difference. Some features are also lost, like the DMA auto-boot loader functionality. There are also some minor pin function changes, but as of 2026 the line continues to be produced in its original 40-pin dual in-line package (DIP) format.

== History ==
=== FRED ===
Joseph Weisbecker had long been fascinated with the potential for computers in the home, having stated as early as 1955 that he expected they would one day be built into practically every device. The technology of the era made small embedded computers impossible, but the introduction of the integrated circuit (IC) in the 1960s changed things dramatically. In 1974 he described the possibilities in an IEEE Computer article:

For 20 years computer hardware has become increasingly complex, languages more devious, and operating systems less efficient. Now, microcomputers afford some of us the opportunity to return to simpler systems. Inexpensive...microcomputers could open up vast new markets.

Beginning in 1970, (Note: The exact date varies between references, as is the case for most dates related to the COSMAC. Edwards puts it in 1969, while most others say 1970, the date used here.) Weisbecker began the design of a small machine using RCA transistor-transistor logic (TTL) ICs to construct the processor. Other parts, switches and lamps and such, he had to buy from Radio Shack, deliberately spreading his purchases around four stores so no one would ask him why he was buying so many parts. The design was running in October 1971, containing 100 chips spread over multiple circuit boards.

The result, which he called FRED, ostensibly for Flexible Recreational Educational Device, was packaged into a box that was not unlike the Altair 8800 of a few years later, with toggle switches on the front panel for input, lamps for output, and later adding a hex pad keyboard. Weisbecker added new features continually and by 1972 it had gained a character generator and the ability to load and save programs on cassette tapes.

Weisbecker's daughter, Joyce Weisbecker, was immediately drawn to the system and began writing programs for it. This included several games, which were ported to later machines based on the COSMAC. When RCA entered the game console business in the later 1970s, these games were burned to ROM cartridge form, and Joyce became the first known female commercial videogame developer.

=== Release ===
Weisbecker demonstrated the machine to RCA management throughout this period, but there was little interest at first. This was shortly after David Sarnoff had retired and handed the CEO role to his son, Robert Sarnoff. Robert was more interested in building the media side of the company while dating recording stars, ignoring RCA Laboratories in spite of a number of industry-leading developments taking place there. Some of the skepticism displayed by management may have had to do with the company's recent sale of their mainframe computer business to Sperry Rand with a huge writedown.

Eventually, the company became interested in the system and began adapting it to their newly introduced COS/MOS fabrication system. A 1973 lab report (Note: This was the annual review of 1973's operations, published some time in 1974.) refers to a "prototype" being delivered in 1972, but this is likely referring to the original TTL implementation. It goes on to note that an effort to reduce the processor to a two-chip implementation with deliveries in COS/MOS in 1974. It is here that the processor is first referred to as COSMAC, for COmplementary-Symmetry-Monolithic-Array Computer. It goes on to state that another lab will be producing the system in an 8-chip silicon-on-sapphire format, although the date is simply "soon after" the CMOS versions, and that plans for a single-chip version were already being planned. (Note: The exact dates of the sampling and general release of the various COSMAC devices remain imprecise. Herb Johnson has produced an extensive list of RCA reports that form the basis of the dates in this article.)

=== COSMAC devices ===
Although RCA began the development of the COSMAC in the early 1970s, it was some time before they introduced their own products based on it. In 1975, a prototype of an arcade game machine with swappable ROMs was experimented with for the coin-op business, but was ultimately abandoned.

Meanwhile, Weisbecker had adapted the original FRED, known within RCA as System 00 by this time, using the new chipset to produce a greatly simplified single-board system known as then COSMAC Elf. Building instructions were described in an article in Popular Electronics magazine in 1976, and an expanded version with various upgrades in a second article in 1977. A unique feature of the ELF is that it did not require any read-only memory (ROM) for startup, instead, the processor's direct memory access (DMA) system was used to read front-panel switches directly into memory.

RCA debated whether to introduce pre-packaged versions of the ELF to the market. While they debated, further development led to a simplified machine combining the ELF with a new display driver chip, the CDP1861, to produce a game console. During this time, Joyce Weisbecker (Joseph's daughter) was hired by RCA to write several videogames for the platform, including a quiz-style educational product in partnership with Random House, one of the many companies that had been picked up by RCA's buying sprees.

After a year of discussion, the company eventually decided to release two mass-market products based on the platform, a kit computer known as the COSMAC VIP, and a game console known as the RCA Studio II. The machines had been available since 1975, but the Studio II was announced only in January 1977, a couple of months after the Fairchild Channel F became the first cartridge-based machine on the market. Both would soon be eclipsed and largely forgotten due to the release of the Atari 2600 later that year. RCA canceled the Studio II in February 1978.

RCA also released a series of modular computer systems, based on the RCA Microboard form factor from the 1802's initial release, up until the collapse of RCA itself. These were mainly aimed at industrial applications and systems development, and were highly configurable.

=== Embedded use ===
The COSMAC would find great success in the embedded market, because its CMOS design allowed it to work at lower power. By the late 1970s it was widely used in many industrial settings, and especially aerospace. Multiple 1802s were used as auxiliary IO processors in the Galileo probe to Jupiter in 1989, and it remains in use in similar roles as of 2017.

== Applications ==
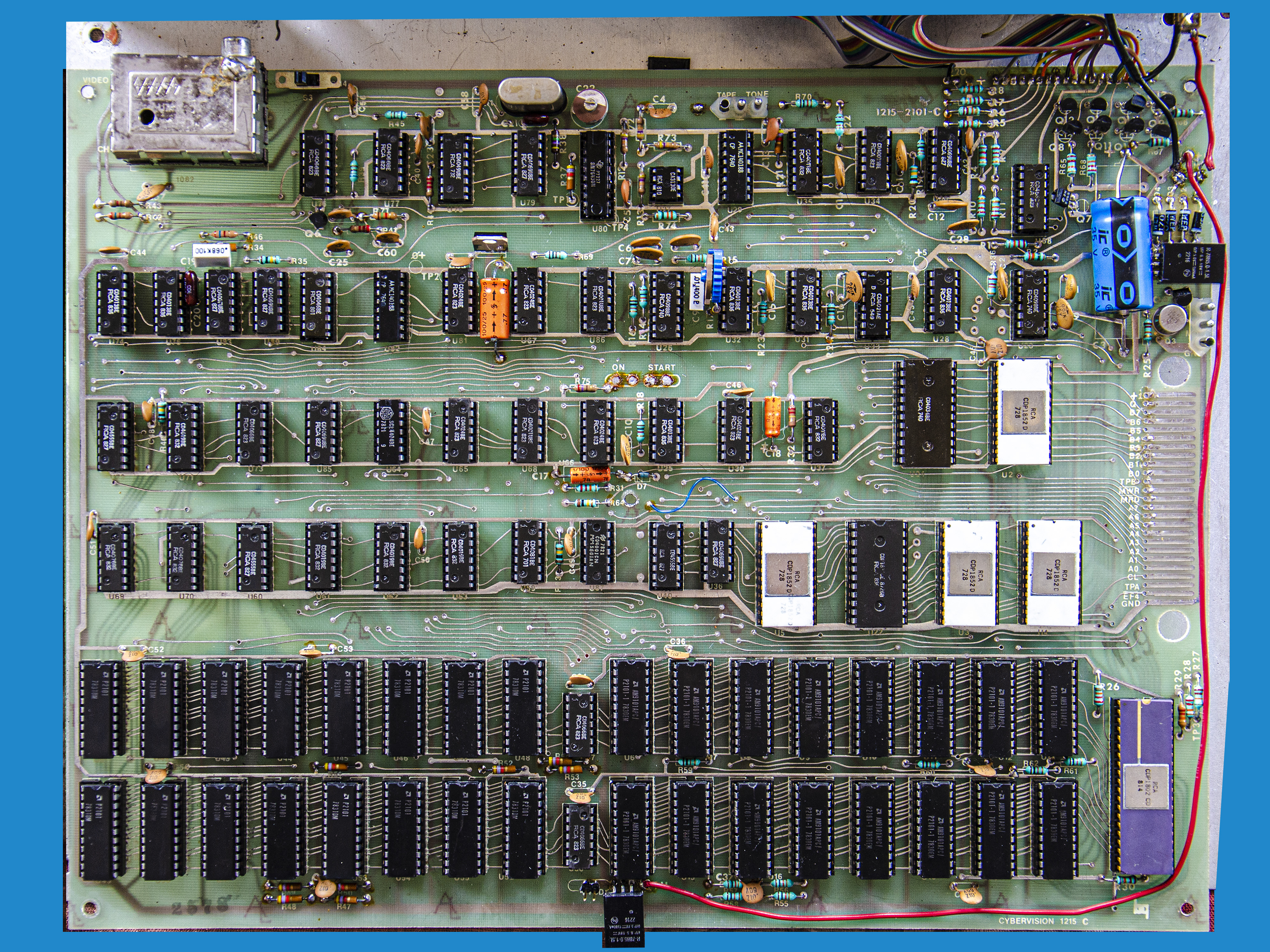
1802-based CyberVision 2001 logic board. It features 4K of static RAM and 1K ROM.

=== Microcomputer systems ===
A number of early microcomputers were based on the 1802, including the COSMAC Elf (1976), Netronics ELF II, Quest SuperELF, COSMAC VIP, Comx-35, Finnish Telmac 1800, Telmac TMC-600 and Oscom Nano, Yugoslav Pecom 32 and 64, and the CyberVision 2001 systems sold through Montgomery Ward in the late 1970s, as well as the RCA Studio II video game console (one of the first consoles to use bitmapped graphics). The Edukit single-board computer trainer system, similar to an expanded COSMAC Elf, was offered by Modus Systems Ltd. in Britain in the early 1980s. Infinite Incorporated produced an 1802-based, expandable console computer trainer in the late 1970s called the UC1800, available assembled or in kit form.

As part of 1802 retrocomputing hobbyist work, other computers have been built more recently (post-2000), including the Membership Card microcomputer kit that fits in an Altoids tin and the Spare Time Gizmos Elf 2000 (Elf 2K), among others. See § Emulators and simulators for other systems.

=== Product integration ===
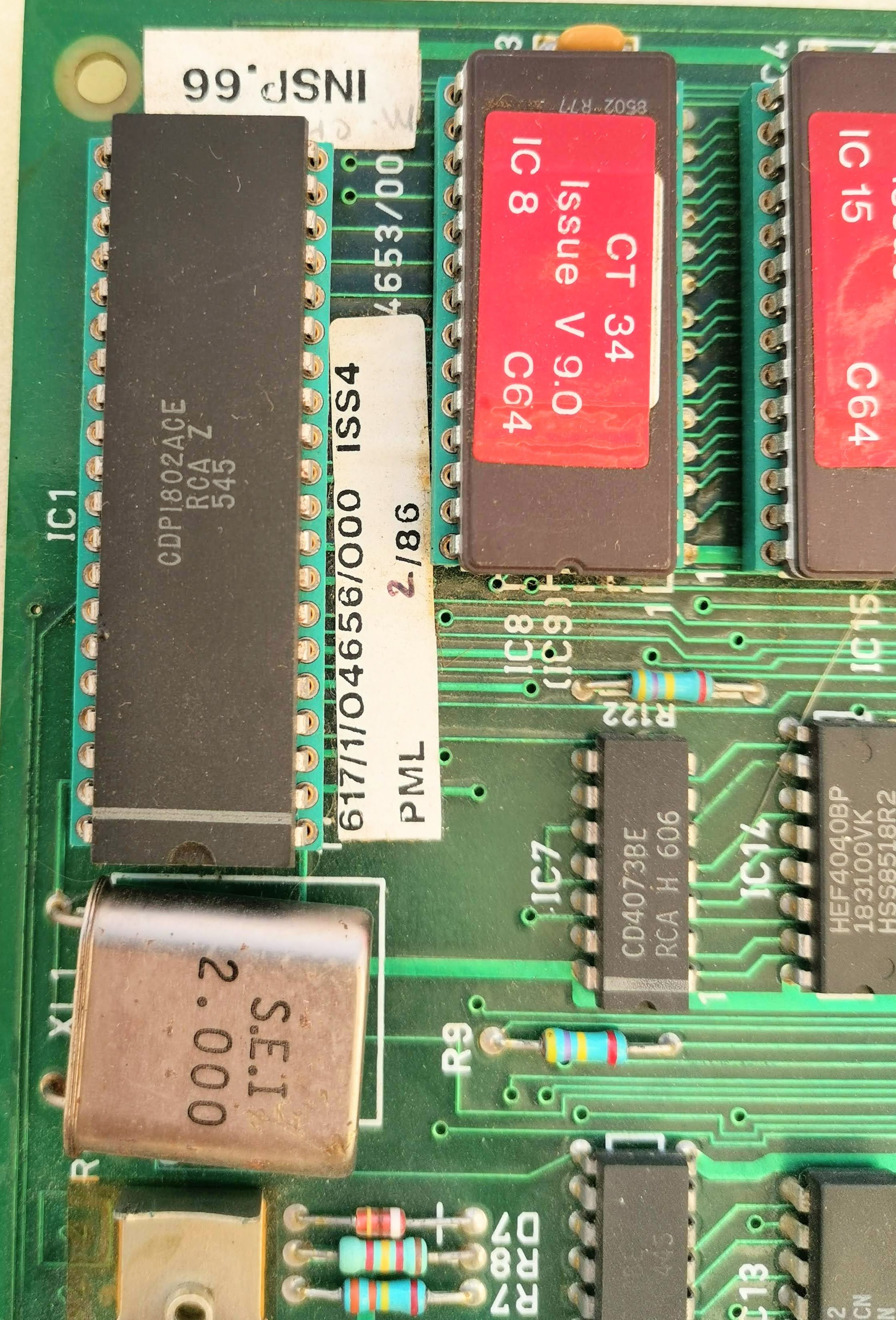
The CDP1802ACE in the CT34 UK Payphone

The 1802 was used in scientific instruments and commercial products.

The 1802 was used in Plessey payphones.

Post-1980 Chrysler and associated model vehicles use the 1802 in their second-generation Electronic Lean-Burn System, with electronic spark control, one of the first on-board auto computer-based control systems.

The 1802 was used in the manufacture of pinball machines and video arcade games in Spain.

=== Radiation hardening ===
A high-speed version of the 1802 was fabricated in Silicon on Sapphire (SOS) semiconductor process technology, which gives it a degree of resistance to radiation and electrostatic discharge (ESD). A different radiation-hardened version of the 1802, developed jointly by RCA and Sandia National Laboratories, was built on bulk silicon using C^{2}L (Closed COS/MOS Logic) technology. Along with its extreme low-power abilities, this makes the chip well-suited in space and military applications. (Also, at the time the 1802 was introduced, very few, if any, other radiation-hardened microprocessors were available in the market).

=== Space technology and science ===
The 1802 was used in many spacecraft and space science programs, experiments, projects and modules such as the Galileo spacecraft, Magellan, the Plasma Wave Analyzer instrument on ESA's Ulysses spacecraft, various Earth-orbiting satellites and satellites carrying amateur radio.

Several subsystems of NASA's Hubble Space Telescope use 1802 processors, including the WFPC and the MATs.

=== Military uses ===
A number of British military items from the 1980s and 1990s used the 1802, amongst them:

- L1A1 Fuze Setter
- SAWES training system (Small Arms Weapons Effects Simulator) fitted to SLR / SA80 rifles
- Ptarmigan battlefield communications system

== Programming languages ==
The first high-level language available for the 1802 was Forth, provided by Forth, Inc. and it was known as MicroFORTH, in 1976 (see Forth Inc's archive). Other available programming languages, both interpreters and compilers, are CHIP-8 (also invented by Joseph Weisbecker) (and variants), 8th (a version of Forth created by Lee Hart), Tom Pittman's Tiny BASIC, C, various Assemblers and cross-assemblers, and others. Other specialty languages were used by federal agencies such as NASA and its installations, including Johnson Space Center, AMES, Goddard, Langley, Marshall, and Jet Propulsion Laboratory (JPL), which included the HAL/S cross-compiler, STOIC, a Forth-like language, and others.

Interpreter for Process Structures (IPS), a programming language and development environment, was specifically written and used for real-time control of AMSAT satellites.

=== Emulators and simulators ===
The 1802 chip and computers using the microprocessor have been emulated and simulated in hardware and/or software by hobbyists. There are three designs in VHDL for an FPGA. A bus-accurate, full speed COSMAC Elf clone was created without a CDP1802 microprocessor chip or CDP1861 video chip using PIC microcontrollers. An online simulator of the COSMAC Elf (enhanced) written in JavaScript runs in the user's browser with no need to download.

== Description ==
=== Introduction ===
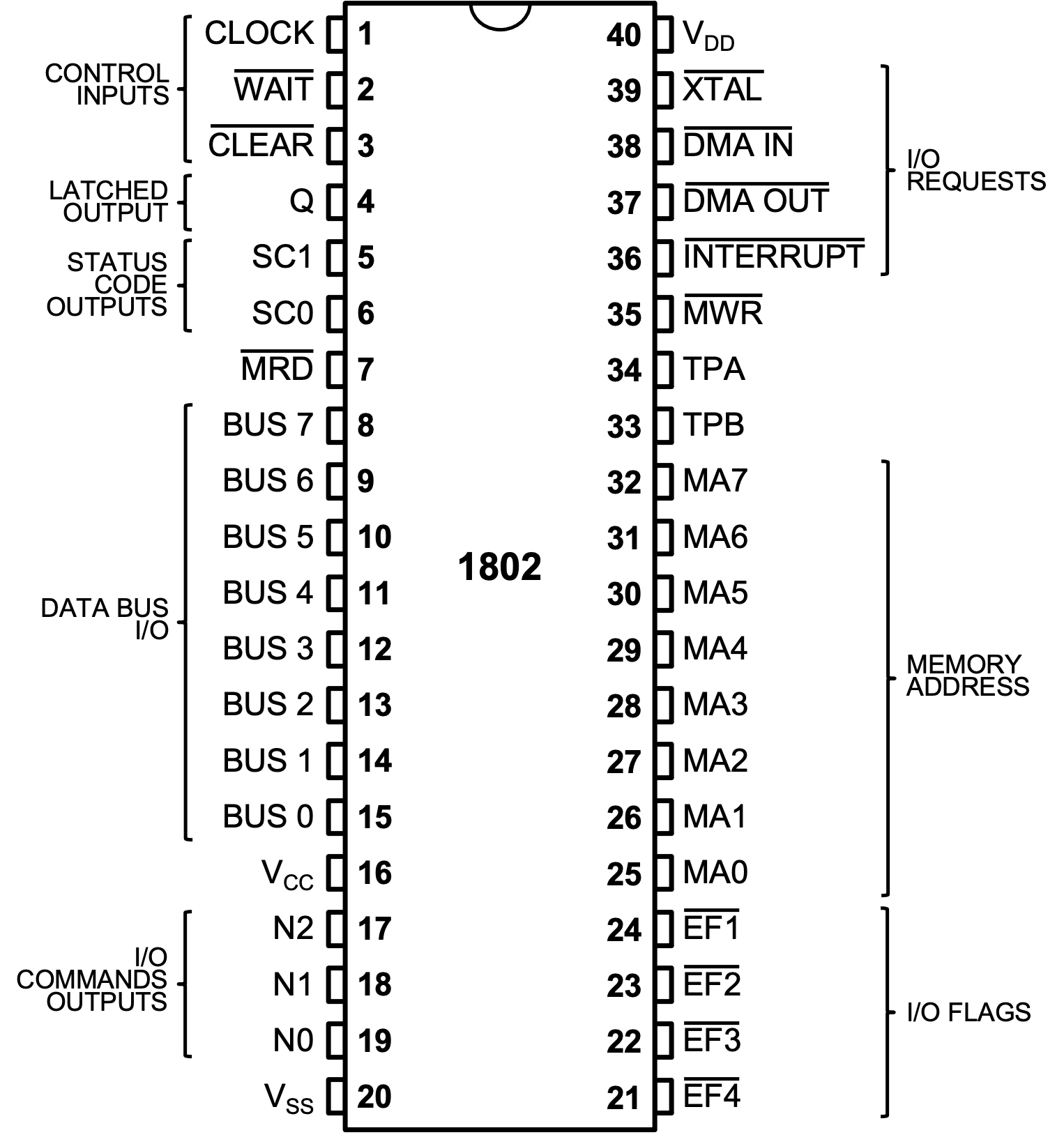
RCA CDP1802 COSMAC processor DIP chip pinout

The RCA 1802 has a static core CMOS design with no minimum clock frequency, so that it can be run at very low speeds and low power, including a clock frequency of zero to suspend the microprocessor without affecting its operation.

It has two separate 8-pin buses: an 8-bit bidirectional data bus and a time-multiplexed address bus, with the high-order and low-order 8-bits of the 16-bit address being asserted with a two-clock delay on the lower address. This contrasts with most designs of the era, like the MOS 6502 and Intel 8080, which used a dedicated 16-bit address bus. The 1802 also compares unfavorably with the Intel 8085 which multiplexed its lower address on the unused data bus incurring almost no address delay at all.

The 1802 has a single bit, programmable and testable output port (Q), and four input pins that are directly tested by branch instructions (EF1-EF4). These pins allow simple input/output (I/O) tasks to be handled directly and easily programmed.

Because the instructions took 16 or 24 clock cycles to complete, the 1802 was not particularly fast. For comparison, the 6502 completes most instruction in 2 to 4 clock cycles, with the longest (official instruction) taking 7 cycles.

=== Part number suffix designations ===
Various suffixes to the CDP1802 part number denote technical specifications, including (A, B, & C) operating speed (3.2 MHz to 6.4 MHz), temperature (-40 °C to +85 °C, -55 °C to +125 °C), and voltage ranges (4V to 10.5V), package type (D, E, Q), and burn-in (X). These were somewhat standardized between the various source suppliers, including RCA, Intersil, Harris, Hughes Aircraft, and Solid State Scientific (SSS). Hughes used the HCMP prefix, and SSS used the SCP (and possibly BCP) prefix, instead of CDP, and had additional suffixes that have not been documented as of yet. (examples: CDP1802A, CDP1802ACE, CDP1802BCD, HCMP1802AP, SCP1802D)

Suffix	Package Type
E	PDIP = Plastic Dual In-Line Package
D	SBDIP = Side-Brazed Ceramic Dual In-Line Package
Q	PLCC = Plastic Leaded Chip Carrier
X	Burn-in

=== Instructions ===
Most RCA 1802 instructions are one byte (8 bits) in length. In these instructions, the upper four bits (the high-order nibble) specify the instruction opcode and are latched into the I register during instruction fetch. The lower four bits (the low-order nibble) select one of the sixteen general-purpose registers and are latched into the N register.

For register-referencing instructions, the register designated by N provides the source or destination operand, depending on the operation. During program execution, intermediate values and state are commonly held in the selected register, allowing multi-step operations to be carried out across successive instructions.

Some instructions, such as LDI (Load Immediate), are two bytes (16 bits) in length. In these cases, the first byte contains the opcode, while the second byte supplies an immediate operand or address value that is consumed by the instruction. Program execution may also involve transfers between registers and memory, as well as conditional and unconditional branch operations, enabling control flow changes as execution proceeds.

=== Registers and I/O ===
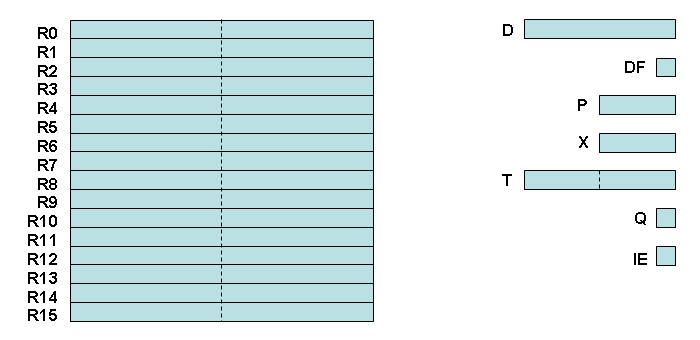
Register model

The 1802 is an 8-bit byte machine, with minimal support for 16-bit operations, except via 2-byte manipulation. The primary accumulator is the 8-bit 'D' register (Data register). The single bit carry flag is DF (Data Flag). Most operations use the D register, including arithmetic and logic functions, and memory referencing load and store instructions. Most 16-bit operations have to work on the lower byte and then the upper byte, via D, using the DF as carry and borrow as needed.

An important feature of the 1802 is a set of sixteen registers of 16 bits each, used primarily for addressing. The SEP instruction can select any of the 16 registers to be the program counter. The SEX instruction can select any of the 16-bit registers to be the index register. Register R0 has the special use of holding the memory address for the built-in DMA controller. Register R1 has the special use of being the program counter for the interrupt handler. Some instructions use R2 for a stack.

There are instructions that allow the values in these registers to be set and read via D, separately working the upper and lower 8-bits at a time. There are also instructions to perform increment and decrement of the entire 16-bit value, and a few instructions perform automatic increment and decrement, like LDA (load advance) and STXD (store via X and decrement). 16-bit register and value comparisons would also need to use the D register as a go-between, using multiple instructions to perform the operations.

The processor has five special I/O lines. There is a single Q output that can be set with the SEQ instruction and reset with the REQ instruction. There are four external, single-bit flag inputs, EF1, EF2, EF3, and EF4, and there are eight dedicated branch instructions to conditionally branch based on the state of those input lines. There are seven INput and seven OUTput port instructions that use the R(X) register and D accumulator.

The EF and Q lines were typically used for multiple interfaces on 1802-based hobbyist computers because of the lines' favorable and easy handling. It was typical for the Q line to drive a status LED, a cassette interface, an RS-232 interface, and a speaker. This meant that the user could actually hear RS-232 and cassette data being transmitted (unless a volume control was implemented). Traditionally, the EF4 line is attached to the INPUT momentary push button on the COSMAC Elf. Other systems might use one of the other lines.

There are some other special use registers and flags, some internal, and some usable programmatically: 4-bit N, P, and X; 8-bit T; and 1-bit IE.

=== Branching ===
There are three types of unconditional and conditional branching in the 1802, Short and Long, and Skips.

Short branches are 2-byte instructions, and use 256-byte range, single byte address, page absolute addressing in the range 0 to 255 (hex FF). There is no relative branching. The short branch always jumps within the page that contains the address byte.

Long branches use full 16-bit addressing to support the 64K memory address space, and are the only 3-byte instructions.

Skip instructions increment the PC by one for the unconditional Short Skip, or two for the Long Skips. Only the Long Skip has conditional branching.

=== Subroutine calls ===
The processor does not have standard subroutine CALL address and RET instructions, though they can be simulated. The 16-register design makes possible some interesting subroutine call and return mechanisms, though they are better suited to small programs than general purpose coding.

A few commonly used subroutines can be called quickly by keeping their address in one of the 16 registers; however, the called subroutine must know (hard coded) what the calling PC register is to perform the "return" instruction. The SEP instruction is used to call a subroutine pointed to by one of the 16-bit registers and another SEP to return to the caller SEP stands for Set Program Counter, and selects which one of the 16 registers is to be used as the program counter from that point onward. Before a subroutine returns, it jumps to the location immediately preceding its entry point so that after the SEP "return" instruction returns control to the caller, the register will be pointing to the right value for next usage. The processor always increments the PC after reference and usage (pointing to the next instruction to execute), so this technique works as noted.

An interesting variation of this scheme is to have two or more subroutines in a ring so that they are called in round robin order. On early hobbyist computers, tricks and techniques like this were commonly used in the horizontal refresh interrupt to reprogram the scan line address to repeat each scan line four times for the video controller.

One well-known and often-used routine is known as SCRT (Standard CALL and RETURN Technique), which allows general purpose subroutine Call and Return, including passing of parameters "in line", and nested subroutines using a stack. Although any of the available registers can be used for this technique, per programmer's preference, many use the routine supplied by RCA in the CDP1802 User Manual, where the suggested register usage is R2 = Stack Pointer, R3 = General Program Counter (PC), R4 = Call, R5 = Return, R6 = Passed Arguments Pointer (non-destructive). Even though these supportive routines are small, there is an execution speed overhead using them, as opposed to what would be incurred if actual CALL and RET instructions were part of the microprocessor's design. This setup allows R0 to be used for DMA and R1 to be used for Interrupts, if desired, allowing R7 through RF (hex) for general program usage.

=== Addressing modes ===
Because of the 16-bit address bus, and the 8-bit data bus, the sixteen general purpose registers are 16 bits wide, but the accumulator D-register is only 8 bits wide. The accumulator, therefore, tends to be a bottleneck. Transferring the contents of one register to another involves four instructions (one Get and one Put on the HI byte of the register, and a similar pair for the LO byte: GHI R1; PHI R2; GLO R1; PLO R2). Similarly, loading a new constant into a register (such as a new address for a subroutine jump, or the address of a data variable) also involves four instructions (two load immediate, LDI, instructions, one for each half of the constant, each one followed by a Put instruction to the register, PHI and PLO).

The addressing modes, Indirect register, Indirect register with auto-increment, and Indirect register with auto-decrement are fairly efficient to perform 8-bit operations on the data in the accumulator. There are no other addressing modes, though. Thus, the direct addressing mode needs to be emulated using the four instructions mentioned earlier to load the address into a spare register, followed by an instruction to select that register as the index register, followed, finally, by the intended operation on the data variable that is pointed to by that address.

The auto-increment and auto-decrement modes can be used to create a crude stack. Stack pointers on other processors are implemented with pre-decrement and post-increment operations or a variant of this. As the COSMAC only offers post increment and decrements, a stack pointer must be explicitly corrected with an INC or DEC instruction when changing directions. R2 is most often used as a stack pointer due to the MARK instruction and interrupt behavior. STXD can be used as a PUSH and LDXI or LDA can be used to POP.

Although ALU operations with indirect register and immediate addressing modes are supported, ALU operations directly with registers are not. Only loads, stores, increments, and decrements are supported on registers.

=== Interrupts ===
When the 1802 is initialized, interrupts are enabled after the first instruction. If this is not desired, interrupts can be disabled by immediately executing a DIS instruction followed by an inline parameter of 00. To set up interrupts, R1 is loaded to the address of the ISR and R2 is loaded to an area the ISR can use for a stack. DMA is also always on unless externally inhibited.

When the INT- line is held low and the current instruction or DMA cycle has completed, the contents of the X and P registers are stored in the temporary register T. X is set to 2 and P is set to 1. This has the effect of switching the program counter to the ISR and R(X) to a stack. IE is cleared, disabling further interrupts. At this point the interrupt service routine is in control. A DEC R2 instruction is used to allocate space on the stack, and a SAV instruction copies the T register (with the old contents of X and P) to the stack. The accumulator is saved with another DEC R2 and STXD. DF is saved by a SHL and another STXD. Further state, as needed, can be saved in a similar way. The interrupt code then services the hardware, releasing the INT- line.

To exit the interrupt service routine an INC R2 is executed to fix the stack pointer. Any registers saved are restored off the stack. DF is restored with an LDXA and SHR. The accumulator D is then restored with LDXA. Recall that R1 is the pointer to the address of the ISR. As R1 has been used as the program counter since the ISR started, the ISR address held by it has been altered. This is fixed by branching to just before the ISR entry point and executing a RET. This points R1 back to the ISR entry point, enables interrupts, and reloads the old X and P from the stack, exiting the interrupt.

=== DMA and load mode ===
The CDP1802 has a simple built-in DMA controller, having two DMA request lines for DMA input and output. The CPU only accesses memory during certain cycles of the multi-step machine cycle, which required between 8 and 16 clock cycles. External hardware could read or write data during these periods without interrupting the processor, a general concept known as cycle stealing.

R0 is used as the DMA address pointer. The starting address of the DMA data would be put in R0 and then pulling the appropriate read or write pin on the CPU low. The CPU responds to the DMA request by incrementing the value in R0, so that the next request automatically uses the next location in memory. Thus by simply repeatedly triggering the DMA pins, the system would walk through the entire memory, reading and/or writing as commanded by the request lines.

The DMA controller also provides a special "load mode", which allows loading of memory while the CLEAR and WAIT inputs of the processor are active. This allows a program to be loaded without the need for a ROM-based bootstrap loader. This was used by the COSMAC Elf microcomputer and its successors to load a program from toggle switches or a hexadecimal keypad with no required software and minimal hardware. The user could simply set the switches to the next value, toggle the read, and then move on. There was no need to change the addresses, that was done automatically by the DMA stepping.

=== Instruction set ===
Clock cycle efficiency is poor in comparison to most 8-bit microprocessors. Eight clock cycles makes up one machine cycle. Most instructions take two machine cycles (16 clock cycles) to execute; long branches, long skips, and NOP take three machine cycles (24 clock cycles). By comparison, the MOS Technology 6502 takes two to seven clock cycles to execute an instruction and the Intel 8080 takes four to 18 clock cycles.

RCA CDP1802 instruction set
Opcode								Operands		Mnemonic	Description
7	6	5	4	3	2	1	0	b2	b3	Mnemonic	Description
0	0	0	0	0	0	0	0	—	—	IDL	Wait for interrupt or DMA cycle
0	0	0	0	n				—	—	LDN n	D ← M(R(n)) [load mem via Rn, n≠0]
0	0	0	1	n				—	—	INC n	R(n) ← R(n) + 1
0	0	1	0	n				—	—	DEC n	R(n) ← R(n) - 1
0	0	1	1	COND				add	—	BR BQ BZ BDF SKP; BNQ BNZ BNF add	If COND true, R(P).0 ← add [copy add to low half of R(P)]
0	0	1	1	n	1	e		add	—	B1 B2 B3 B4; BN1 BN2 BN3 BN4 add	If EF(e+1) ≠ n then R(P).0 ← add
0	1	0	0	n				—	—	LDA n	D ← M(R(n)); R(n) ← R(n) + 1
0	1	0	1	n				—	—	STR n	M(R(n)) ← D
0	1	1	0	0	0	0	0	—	—	IRX	R(X) ← R(X) + 1
0	1	1	0	0	p			—	—	OUT p	BUS ← M(R(X)); R(X) ← R(X) + 1; N = p [p≠0]
0	1	1	0	1	p			—	—	IN p	D ← M(R(X)) ← BUS; N = p + 8 [p≠0]
0	1	1	1	0	0	0	0	—	—	RET	t ← M(R(X)); R(X) ← R(X) + 1; X:P ← t; IE ← 1 (Note: The operation shown is likely the actual operation of the 1802. 1802 documentation, however, shows this operation as X:P ← M(R(X)); R(X) ← R(X) + 1; IE ← 0 or 1. If this were true, an unpredictable R(X) would be incremented each time an interrupt returns.)
0	1	1	1	0	0	0	1	—	—	DIS	t ← M(R(X)); R(X) ← R(X) + 1; X:P ← t; IE ← 0
0	1	1	1	0	0	1	0	—	—	LDXA	D ← M(R(X)); R(X) ← R(X) + 1
0	1	1	1	0	0	1	1	—	—	STXD	M(R(X)) ← D; R(X) ← R(X) - 1
0	1	1	1	0	1	0	0	—	—	ADC	DF:D ← D + M(R(X)) + DF
0	1	1	1	0	1	0	1	—	—	SDB	DF:D ← M(R(X)) - D - (¬DF)
0	1	1	1	0	1	1	0	—	—	SHRC	D_{0-6} ← D_{1-7}; D_{7} ← DF; DF ← D_{0}
0	1	1	1	0	1	1	1	—	—	SMB	DF:D ← D - M(R(X)) - (¬DF)
0	1	1	1	1	0	0	0	—	—	SAV	M(R(X)) ← T
0	1	1	1	1	0	0	1	—	—	MARK	M(R(2)) ← T ← X:P; X ← P; R(2) ← R(2) - 1
0	1	1	1	1	0	1	b	—	—	REQ SEQ	Q ← b
0	1	1	1	1	1	0	0	imm	—	ADCI imm	DF:D ← D + imm + DF
0	1	1	1	1	1	0	1	imm	—	SDBI imm	DF:D ← imm - D - (¬DF)
0	1	1	1	1	1	1	0	—	—	SHLC	D_{1-7} ← D_{0-6}; D_{0} ← DF; DF ← D_{7}
0	1	1	1	1	1	1	1	—	—	SMBI imm	DF:D ← D - imm - (¬DF)
1	0	0	0	n				—	—	GLO n	D ← R(n).0
1	0	0	1	n				—	—	GHI n	D ← R(n).1
1	0	1	0	n				—	—	PLO n	R(n).0 ← D
1	0	1	1	n				—	—	PHI n	R(n).1 ← D
1	1	0	0	COND				addhi	addlo	LBR LBQ LBZ LBDF LSKP; LBNQ LBNZ LBNF add	If COND true, R(P).1 ← addhi; R(P).0 ← addlo
1	1	0	0	0	1	0	0	—	—	NOP	No operation
1	1	0	0	s	1	0	1	—	—	LSNQ LSQ	IF Q = s then R(P) ← R(P) + 2
1	1	0	0	0	1	1	0	—	—	LSNZ	IF D ≠ 0 then R(P) ← R(P) + 2
1	1	0	0	s	1	1	1	—	—	LSNF LSDF	IF DF = s then R(P) ← R(P) + 2
1	1	0	0	1	1	0	0	—	—	LSIE	IF IE = 1 then R(P) ← R(P) + 2
1	1	0	0	1	1	1	0	—	—	LSZ	IF D = 0 then R(P) ← R(P) + 2
1	1	0	1	n				—	—	SEP n	P ← n
1	1	1	0	n				—	—	SEX n	X ← n
1	1	1	1	0	ALU			—	—	LDX OR AND XOR; ADD SD SM	ALU M(R(X))
1	1	1	1	0	1	1	0	—	—	SHR	DF ← D_{0}; D_{0-6} ← D_{1-7}; D_{7} ← 0
1	1	1	1	1	ALU			imm	—	LDI ORI ANI XRI; ADI SDI SMI imm	ALU imm
1	1	1	1	1	1	1	0	—	—	SHL	DF ← D_{7}; D_{1-7} ← D_{0-6}; D_{0} ← 0
7	6	5	4	3	2	1	0	b2	b3	Mnemonic	Description
				3	2	1	0	COND (branch)		ALU	
				0	0	0	0	BR LBR (always)		LDX LDI (D ← arg)	
				0	0	0	1	BQ LBQ (Q = 1)		OR ORI (D ← D ∨ arg)	
				0	0	1	0	BZ LBZ (D = 00)		AND ANI (D ← D ∧ arg)	
				0	0	1	1	BDF LBDF (DF = 1)		XOR XRI (D ← D ⊻ arg)	
				0	1	0	0			ADD ADI (DF:D ← D + arg)	
				0	1	0	1			SD SDI (DF:D ← arg - D)	
				0	1	1	1			SM SMI (DF:D ← D - arg)	
				1	0	0	0	SKP LSKP (never)			
				1	0	0	1	BNQ LBNQ (Q = 0)			
				1	0	1	0	BNZ LBNZ (D ≠ 00)			
				1	0	1	1	BNF LBNF (DF = 0)			
				3	2	1	0	COND (branch)		ALU	

Key to symbols in instruction table
R0 - R15	sixteen 16-bit general purpose registers
Rn.0	low-order register half
Rn.1	high-order register half
n	register selector embedded in instruction
R(n)	register selected by n
M(R(n))	memory byte addressed by register selected by n
P	4-bit program counter selector
R(P)	Program counter
X	4-bit register selector
R(X)	register selected by X
M(R(X))	memory byte addressed by register selected by X
D	8-bit accumulator
DF	1-bit carry register
DF:D	9-bit combination of carry register and accumulator
IE	1-bit interrupt enable register
Q	1-bit testable output register
EF1 - EF4	four 1-bit testable inputs
T	8-bit temporary register
N	4-bit state code used by IN and OUT

== Support chips ==
=== Graphics ===
In early 1802-based microcomputers, the companion graphics Video Display Controller chip, RCA CDP1861 (for the NTSC video format, CDP1864 variant for PAL), used the built-in DMA controller to display black and white bitmapped graphics on standard TV screens at up to 64 pixels horizontally by 128 pixels vertically. The 1861 was also known as the Pixie graphics system.

Although the faster versions of 1802 could operate at 4–5 MHz (at 5 V; it was faster (6.4 MHz) at 10 V), it was usually operated at 3.58 MHz, divided by 2 (1.79 MHz) to suit the requirements of the 1861 chip, which gave a speed of a little over 100,000 instructions per second, though some ran at other speeds such as the ~2.8 MHz of the Comx or 5 MHz of the Pecom. The COSMAC VIP, which integrated the video chip with the processor as a single purpose-built computer (rather than as an add-on to a hobbyist kit), notably ran the 1802 much slower, synchronising it exactly with the 1861 - at a non-standard 1.76064 MHz, as recommended in the Pixie's spec sheet reference design. (Note: However, given the age of the machine, this may be due to the higher speed grades not having yet been developed, meaning the processor was only rated for a maximum of 3.2, or possibly even just 2.5 MHz. Although it is an extreme case, the machine wouldn't be alone in running a CPU well below its rated speed in order to save cost and complexity in the timing system, and simply running at 3.52 MHz would have represented a risky 10%, or even an unsustainably extreme 41% overclock.)

The CDP1862 Color Generator Circuit IC, an 1861 companion chip, could be used to generate color graphics. Some computer systems, like the Pecom 64 or the Telmac TMC-600, used the VIS (Video Interface System), consisting of the CDP1869 and CDP1870 companion ICs, for distinctly higher resolution color graphics, comparable to other 8-bit systems of the 1980s.

== Code sample ==
The following assembler source code is for a subroutine CPYMEM that copies bytes from one location to another. Both pointers and the count are 16-bit. The 1802 does not support CALL and RET through dedicated instructions like nearly every other microprocessor. Instead, it is expected that a pointer would be set to a subroutine and the SEP instruction would be used to make that pointer the new PC. To return, the subroutine has to select the caller's PC with another SEP. This makes nesting of subroutines difficult. The SCRT calling method (previously described in "subroutine calls" section) provides a subroutine to act as a CALL to a guest subroutine and another subroutine to act as a RET. It adds substantial overhead and uses some registers: R2 as stack pointer, R3 as program counter, R4 to CALL routine, R5 as RETurn routine, R6 as argument pointer. CPYMEM assumes it was called using the SCRT method. Normally when returning, a subroutine branches to just before its entry point to restore its address but the SCRT method does not require this. This universal subroutine jumps to the top so it can be called with or without SCRT.

 
 
 
 
1020
1020 D5
1021 47
1022 58
1023 18
1024 29
1025 89
1026 3A 21
1028 99
1029 3A 21
102B 30 20

; Copy memory bytes addressed by R7 to location addressed
; by R8 for a number of bytes contained in R9.
; This subroutine uses the return procedure pointed to by R5
; This routine assumes 0 through 15 is equated to R0 through R15
        ORG      1020H
CPYR:   SEP      R5         ; Return by flipping PC to R5
CPYMEM: LDA      R7         ; Move byte from @R7 to D, bump R7
        STR      R8         ; Save D to @R8
        INC      R8         ; Bump dest pointer
        DEC      R9         ; Count down the bytes
        GLO      R9         ; See if both halves of R9 are zero
        BNZ      CPYMEM     ; first lower
        GHI      R9         ; then upper
        BNZ      CPYMEM     ; else loop for all bytes
        BR       CPYR       ; go to top so routine can be reused
