= Erin S. Baker =

American bioanalytical chemist

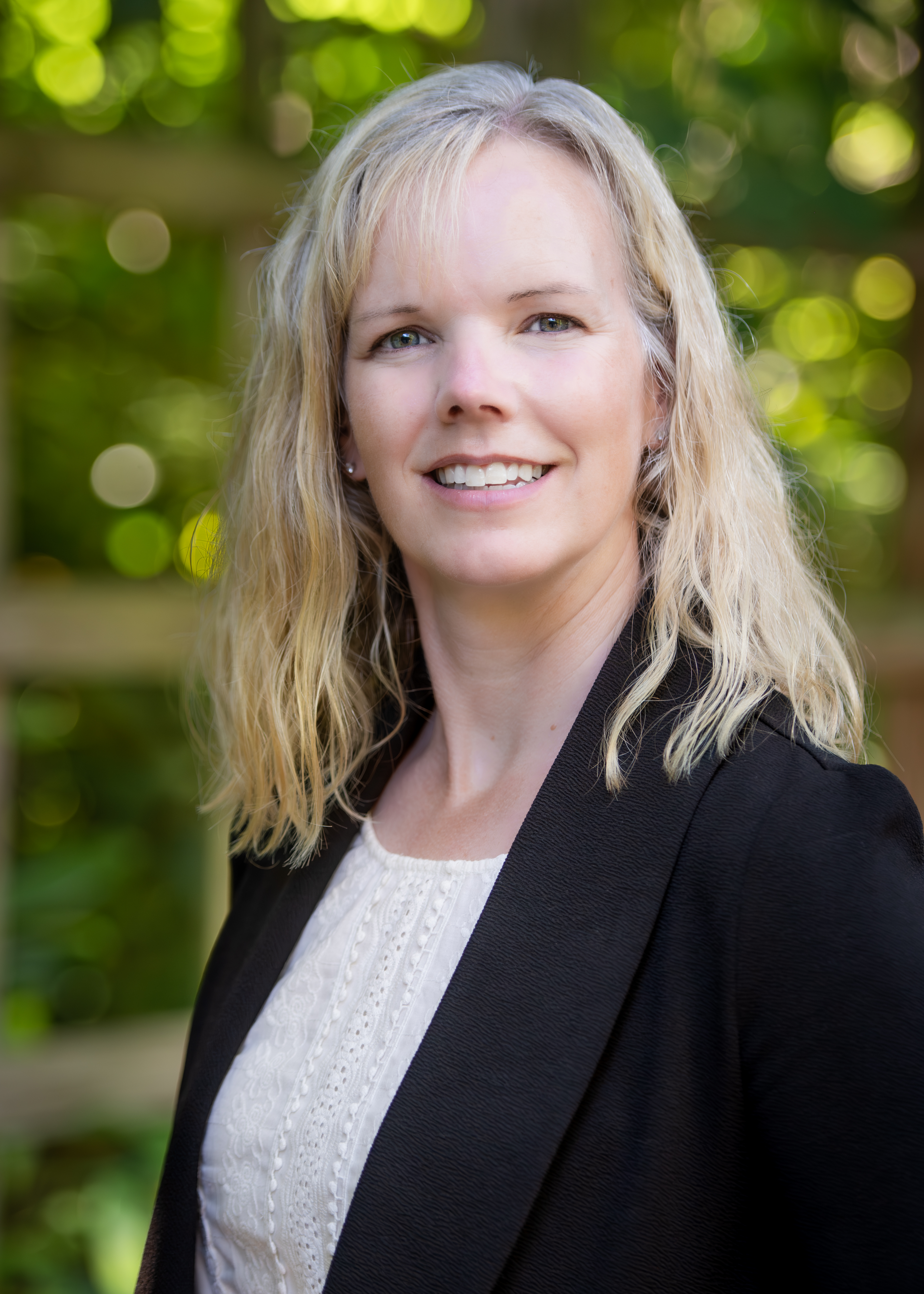
- Education: Montana State University; University of California, Santa Barbara
- Awards: American Society for Mass Spectrometry Biemann Medal (2022); International Mass Spectrometry Foundation Curt Brunnée Award (2022)
- Scientific career
- Workplaces: University of North Carolina at Chapel Hill
- Thesis: From solution to a solvent-free environment : probing the structures of noncovalently bound DNA and RNA complexes (2005)
- Doctoral advisor: Michael T. Bowers

Erin Shammel Baker is an American bioanalytical chemist specializing in developing ion mobility-mass spectrometry hybrid instruments for biological and environmental applications. Baker is an expert in the research of perfluoroalkyl and polyfluoroalkyl substances analysis.

== Early life and education ==
Baker grew up on a cattle ranch in Montana, US. Her interests in chemistry stemmed from a determination to understand the arsenic and cyanide pollution from gold mines that affected animals on her family's ranch and local wildlife. She obtained a bachelor of science in chemistry, with a minor in mathematics from Montana State University in 2001, where she conducted research using ion mobility spectrometry in Eric Grimsrud's laboratory. She continued with research in ion mobility spectrometry in graduate school, and received a PhD in chemistry under the direction of Michael T. Bowers from University of California, Santa Barbara in 2005.

== Career ==
After graduation, Baker did post-doctoral research in Richard D. Smiths' laboratory at Pacific Northwest National Laboratory (PNNL), and was later promoted to senior research scientist. In 2018, she began her academic career at North Carolina State University as associate professor, and moved to University of North Carolina at Chapel Hill in 2022.

The scope of Baker's research involves both developing high throughput ion mobility–mass spectrometry (IMS–MS) systems and using these hybrid instruments to study biological and environmental systems. She was one of five researchers from the PNNL Interactive Omics Group who worked on the Structures for lossless ion manipulations (SLIM). The group received the R&D 100 Award for their effort on SLIM in 2017. She was also part of the PNNL team who helped with the commercialization of the Agilent 6560 Ion Mobility Quadrupole Time-of-Flight (IM–QTOF) Liquid Chromatography–Mass Spectrometer system. She is an expert in the research of perfluoroalkyl and polyfluoroalkyl substances (PFAS) analysis. She is the director of the Core of Advanced Platform Technologies Used for Remediation and Exploration (CAPTURE), the analytical branch of the PFAS Superfund Research Centre. She is named one of the "Worldwide Water Warriors" in 2017.

Baker served as a member-at-large for education for the American Society for Mass Spectrometry from 2019 to 2020. She serves on the editorial board of Journal of the American Society for Mass Spectrometry, Journal of Proteome Research, International Journal of Mass Spectrometry, and Scientific Reports.

== Awards ==
- 2025 Fellow of the American Society for Mass Spectrometry
- 2024 The Analytical Scientist The Power List - Instrumental Innovators
- 2023 The Analytical Scientist The Power List - Innovators and Trailblazers
- 2022 American Society for Mass Spectrometry Biemann Medal
- 2022 International Mass Spectrometry Foundation Curt Brunnée Award
- 2021–2022 North Carolina State University Faculty Scholar
- 2021 The Analytical Scientist The Power List
- 2021 North Carolina State University Impact Scholars
- 2019 The Analytical Scientist The Power List
- 2017 Women Chemists Committee of the American Chemical Society Rising Star Award
