= Capillary electrophoresis–mass spectrometry =

Analytical chemistry technique

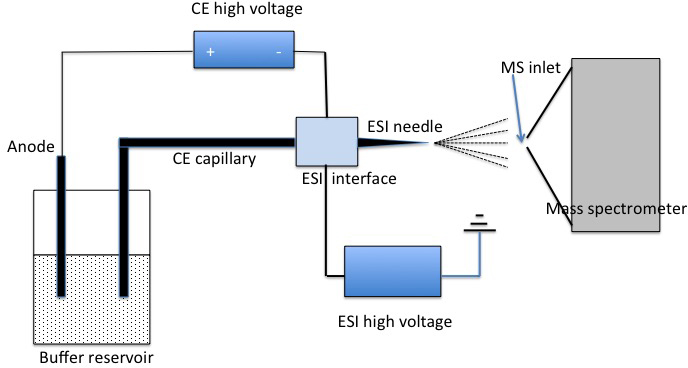
Diagram of capillary electrophoresis–mass spectrometry

Capillary electrophoresis–mass spectrometry (CE–MS) is an analytical chemistry technique formed by the combination of the liquid separation process of capillary electrophoresis with mass spectrometry. CE–MS combines advantages of both CE and MS to provide high separation efficiency and molecular mass information in a single analysis. It has high resolving power and sensitivity, requires minimal volume (several nanoliters) and can analyze at high speed. Ions are typically formed by electrospray ionization, but they can also be formed by matrix-assisted laser desorption/ionization or other ionization techniques. It has applications in basic research in proteomics and quantitative analysis of biomolecules as well as in clinical medicine. Since its introduction in 1987, new developments and applications have made CE-MS a powerful separation and identification technique. Use of CE–MS has increased for protein and peptides analysis and other biomolecules. However, the development of online CE–MS is not without challenges. Understanding of CE, the interface setup, ionization technique and mass detection system is important to tackle problems while coupling capillary electrophoresis to mass spectrometry.

== History ==
The original interface between capillary zone electrophoresis and mass spectrometry was developed in 1987 by Richard D. Smith and coworkers at Pacific Northwest National Laboratory, and who also later were involved in development of interfaces with other CE variants, including capillary isotachophoresis and capillary isoelectric focusing.

== Sample injection ==
There are two common techniques to load the sample into CE–MS system, which is similar to approaches for traditional CE: hydrodynamic and electrokinetic injection.

=== Hydrodynamic injection ===
For loading the analytes, the capillary is firstly placed into sample vial. Then there are different ways for hydrodynamic injection: it can be applied positive pressure to inlet, negative pressure to outlet or the sample inlet can be raised in relation to capillary outlet. This technique is able to provide robust and reproducible injected sample amount in comparison to electrokinetic injection and injection RSD value are usually below 2 %. Injected volume and reproducibility of the sample usually depends on injection time, sample height displacement and the pressure applied to the sample. For example, it has been found that using higher pressure and lower injection time leads to reducing of the RSD for peak areas and migration times. One of the main advantages of hydrodynamic injection is also that it is unbiased to molecules with high or low electrophoretic mobility. To increase throughput of CE–MS analysis hydrodynamic multisegment injection technique was created. In this case several samples are loaded hydrodynamically to the separation capillary before the analysis and each sample segment is placed between background electrolyte spacers.

=== Electrokinetic injection ===
In this method a high voltage is applied to the sample solution and molecules are loaded to the CE capillary by electromigration and electroosmotic flow of the sample. Electrokinetic injection improves the sensitivity comparing to hydrodynamic injection while using lower voltage and longer injection time, but reproducibility of peak areas and migration times is lower. However, method is biased to analytes with high electrophoretic mobility: high mobility molecules are injected better. As a result, electrokinetic injection is susceptible to matrix effects and changes in sample ionic strength.

== Interfacing CE with MS ==
Capillary electrophoresis is a separation technique which uses high electric field to produce electroosmotic flow for separation of ions. Analytes migrate from one end of capillary to other based on their charge, viscosity and size. Higher the electric field, greater is the mobility. Mass spectrometry is an analytical technique that identifies chemical species depending on their mass-to-charge ratio. During the process, an ion source will convert molecules coming from CE to ions that can then be manipulated using electric and magnetic field. The separated ions are then measured using a detector. The major problem faced when coupling CE to MS arises due to insufficient understanding of fundamental processes when two techniques are interfaced. The separation and detection of analytes can be improved with better interface. CE has been coupled to MS using various ionization techniques like FAB, ESI, MALDI, APCI and DESI. The most used ionization technique is ESI.

=== Electrospray ionization interface ===
In the first CE–MS interface a stainless steel capillary sheath around the separation capillary terminus was used instead of terminus electrode in typical CE setup. An electrical contact of stainless steel capillary with background electrolyte flowing out from the separation capillary was made at that point completing the circuit and initiating the electrospray. This interface system had few drawbacks like mismatch in the flow rates of two systems. Since then, interface system has been improved to have continuous flow rate and good electrical contact. Another key factor for successful CE–MS interface is the choice of buffer solution which must be suitable for both CE separation and ESI operation. At present, three types of interface system exist for CE/ESI-MS which are discussed briefly.

==== Sheathless interface ====
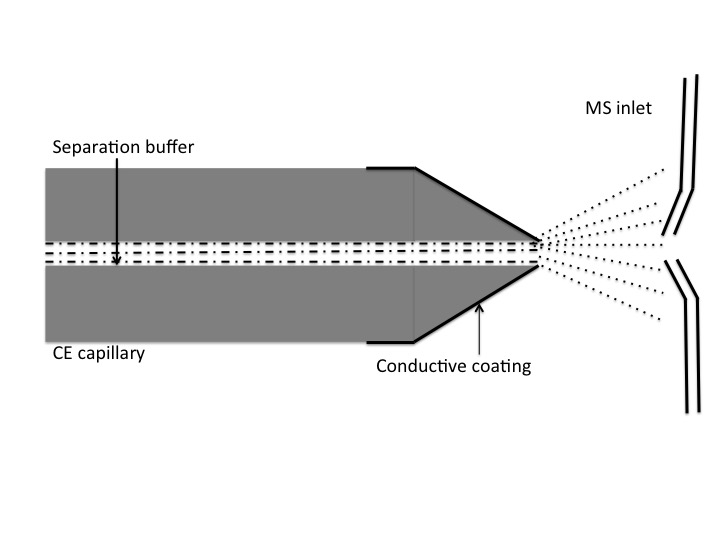
Sheathless interface

CE capillary is coupled directly to an electrospray ionization source with a sheathless interface system. The electric contact for ESI is realized by using capillary coated with conductive metal. Because no sheath liquid is used, the system has high sensitivity, low flow rates and minimum background. However, these interface designs, all have challenges including low mechanical robustness, poor reproducibility.

The latest sheathless interface design features porous ESI emitter through chemical etching. This design effectively provides robust interfacing with mass spectrometry and addresses the reproducibility challenges associated with previous designs. This porous emitter interface has been explored to couple of CITP/CZE (or transient ITP) which greatly improves sample loading capacity of CE and enabled ultrasensitive detection of trace analytes. High reproducibility, robustness and sensitivity were achieved in sheathless transient capillary isatochophoresis (CITP)/capillary zone electrophoresis (CZE) -MS interface, where conductive liquid was used. Conductive liquid contacts with the metal-coated outer surface of the emitter completing the circuit, but at the same time it does not mix with separation liquid and therefore there is no sample dilution.

==== Sheath-flow interface ====
With the sheath-flow interface, the electrical connection between an electrode and background electrolyte is established when the CE separation liquid is mixed with sheath liquid flowing coaxially in a metal capillary tubing. In most popular commercial CE-ESI-MS interfaces an additional outer tube (three-tube coaxial design) with sheath gas is used, which help to improve electrospray stability and solvent evaporation. But it has been found that flow of sheath gas can cause suction effect near the capillary terminus, which lead to parabolic flow profile and, as a consequence, low separation efficiency. Commonly used sheath liquid is 1:1 mixture of water-methanol (or isopropanol) with 0.1% acetic acid or formic acid. The system is more reliable and has wide selection range of separation electrolyte. However, since flow rates of sheath liquid required for a stable electrospray are usually quite high (1-10 μL/min), here might be some decrease in sensitivity due to dilution of samples with sheath liquid. Sheath liquid can be delivered hydrodynamically (with a syringe pump) or electrokinetically. Electrokinetic method allows one easily operate in nanoelectrospray regime (ESI flow rates at nl/min) and thus to improve sensitivity.

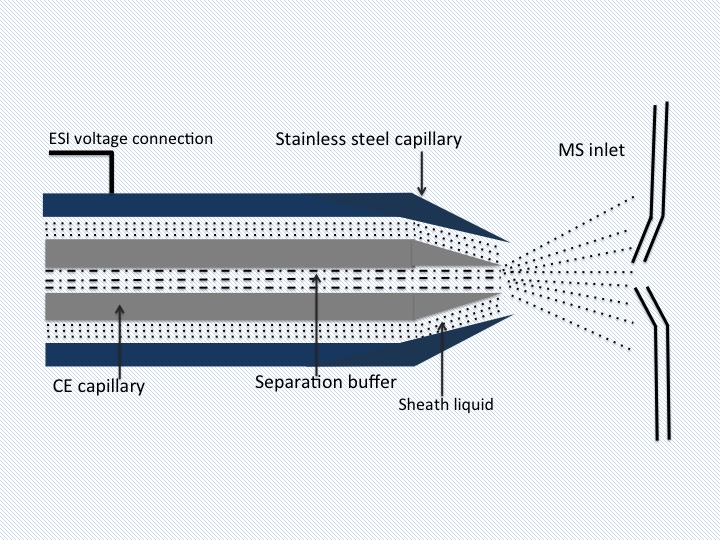
Sheath flow interface

There are some new approaches and improvements for sheath-flow interface. To reduce the dead volume and to increase sensitivity extendable sheath-flow CE-ESI-MS interface was created. The outlet end of the separation capillary was treated with hydrofluoric acid to decrease thin of the wall and to taper the tip. The terminus of separation capillary was protruded from the tapered sheath-flow capillary. Because of thin wall of the separation capillary dead volume is low. As a result, the sensitivity and efficiency of separation increase. Using nanoflow electrospray regime (with small emitters and ESI flow rates below 1000 nl/min) also helps in increase sensitivity, reproducibility and robustness. For making this interface, borosilicate emitter with tapered tip and the separation capillary with etched end may be utilized. To enhance the stability and lifetime of the interface, gold coated emitter was applied.

==== Liquid junction interface ====
This technique uses a stainless steel tee to mix separation electrolyte from CE capillary with make up liquid. The CE capillary and ESI needle are inserted through opposite sides of the tee and a narrow gap is maintained. The electrical contact is established by makeup liquid surrounding the junction between two capillaries. This system is easy to operate. However, the sensitivity is reduced and the mixing of two liquids could degrade separation. One of the kind of liquid junction interfaces is pressurized liquid junction, where pressure is applied to reservoir with makeup liquid. In this method dilution is less than in traditional liquid junction interface due to low flow rates (less than 200 nl/min). Besides, additional pressure prevents defocusing of the CE effluent and, as a result, resolution increases.

=== Continuous-flow fast atom bombardment ===
CE can be coupled to fast atom bombardment ionization using a continuous flow interface. The interface must match the flow rate between the two systems. The CF-FAB requires a relatively high flow rate but CE need low flow rate for better separation. A make-up flow can be used using a sheath flow or liquid junction.

=== Coupling CE with MALDI-MS ===
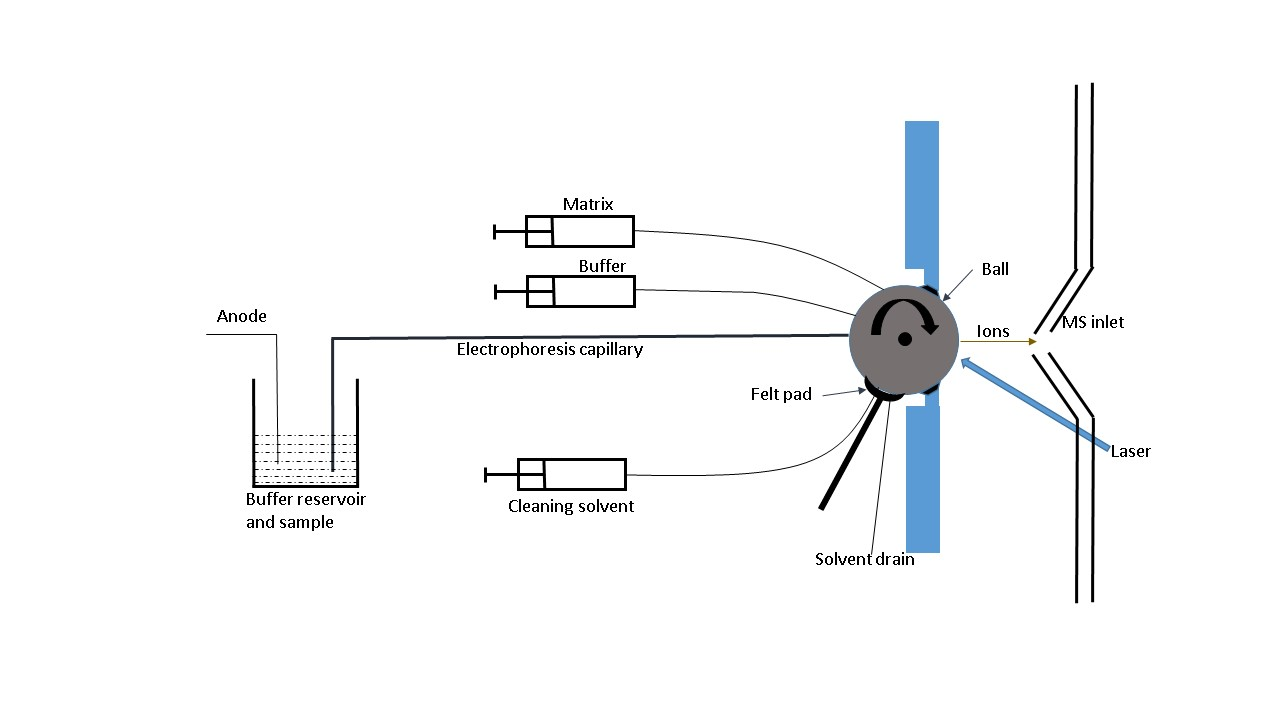
Schematic diagram of online CE-MALDI-MS

Off-line coupling of CE to MALDI, the CE effluent could be sprayed or added drop wise on MALDI target plate then dried and analyzed by MS. For online coupling, a moving target with continuous contact to CE capillary end is required. The moving target takes analytes into MS where it is desorbed and ionized. Musyimi et al. developed a new technique where rotating ball was used to transfer CE to MS. The sample from CE is mixed with matrix coming though another capillary. As the ball rotates the sample is dried before it reaches ionization region. This technique has high sensitivity since no makeup fluid is used.

== Applications ==
CE–MS ability to separate analytes present in extremely low concentration with high efficiency at high speed has made it applicable in all fields of science. CE–MS has been used for bioanalytical, pharmaceuticals, environmental and forensic application. The major application of CE–MS has been for biological studies, mostly for protein and peptide analysis. For example, CE–MS is a component of analysis for both top-down and bottom-up proteomics. Along with that, it is used often for routine analysis of pharmaceutical drugs. There are number of studies reporting characterization of mixtures of peptides and proteins. CE–MS can be used for routine clinical checkup. Body fluids like blood and urine have been analyzed with CE–MS to identify biomarkers for renal diseases and cancer.

CE–MS is also possible to apply for metabolomics, particularly for single-cell metabolomics due to the minute sample volume required. Neurons, frog embryos and HeLa RBC007 cells have been already analyzed using CE–MS. Analysis of cells usually includes extraction of molecules with small amount (several μl) of organic solvent prior to the CE–MS. Due to a new technique surface sampling CE–MS (SS–CE–MS) one can analyze whole tissue sections without sample preparations directly from the surface.

== See also ==
- Liquid chromatography–mass spectrometry
- Gas chromatography–mass spectrometry
