= List of projects published in Radio-Electronics magazine =

This is a list of electronics projects published in Radio-Electronics magazine under the "Build This" heading from 1980 to 1983.

== 1980 ==
| Title | Description | Author | Issue | Publication date |
|---|---|---|---|---|
| Slot machine | Easy to build; fun to use. Hit the jackpot if you can. | Fred Blechman, David McDonald | 51/1 | January 1980 |
| Conference caller for your phone | Add one to your phone today. | Jules Gilder | 51/1 | January 1980 |
| TRS-80 breadboard | Part 3: Now that it's complete here are some practical applications. | Jon Titus, Chris Titus, David Larsen | 51/1 | January 1980 |
| Audio power level meter | Hook it up to your hi-fi and protect your amplifier and speakers against power overload. | Joseph Gorin | 51/2 | February 1980 |
| Satellite TV earth station | Build your own backyard installation for under $1000. | Bob Cooper | 51/2 | February 1980 |
| Versatile switching regulator | This circuit can be programmed for step up, step down, positive, negative, voltage and current regulation. | Robert Frostholm | 51/2 | February 1980 |
| Not just another digital clock | 5 1/2-inch high single-digit LED readout makes this clock unique. | John D. Warobiew | 51/2 | February 1980 |
| Automotive burglar alarm | Build it for less than $20. Automatic feature protects your car without having to turn the alarm on or off. | Steve R. Stout | 51/3 | March 1980 |
| Backyard satellite TV receiver | Details of the LNA front-end gets you started building your own backyard installation. | Robert B. Cooper, Jr. | 51/3 | March 1980 |
| Thunderstorm alarm | Simple radio accessory provides early warning of approaching storm. | Calvin R. Graf | 51/3 | March 1980 |
| Triggered oscilloscope | A 2-MHz bandwidth and a zero-baseline display for under $125. | Daniel Metzger, Dennis Perry | 51/4 | April 1980 |
| Backyard satellite TV receiver | This concluding part describes how to recover the video and audio signals from the satellite signal and then display them on your TV set. | Robert B. Cooper, Jr. | 51/4 | April 1980 |
| Portable electronic organ | Learn to play a keyboard instrument on either one of the two inexpensive organs described. One plays melody, the other plays melody and chords. | I. Queen | 51/4 | April 1980 |
| 3 1/2 digit DMM | Specifically designed for accuracy and minimal cost, this DMM lets you select and add the features you need. | Carson Chen | 51/4 | April 1980 |
| Professional drum synthesizer | Unique device provides many of the features only found in synthesizers costing several times more. | Steve Wood | 51/5 | May 1980 |
| Triggered oscilloscope | Part 2—Final construction details for a scope with a 2-MHz bandwidth and a zero baseline display for under $125. | Daniel Metzger, Dennis Perry | 51/5 | May 1980 |
| Versatile analog interface | When connected to your computer, this simple device along with the proper software can be used for a wide variety of interfacing applications, including joysticks. | John R. Hanson | 51/5 | May 1980 |
| Wide-range audio generator | Great addition for your test bench produces sine and square waves over the audio band from 10 Hz to 50 kHz. | Richard Schroeder | 51/5 | May 1980 |
| Automotive voltage regulator | Improved design overcomes many of the shortcomings of factory-installed units. | L. Steven Cheairs | 51/6 | June 1980 |
| Synthesized function generator | Phase-locked-loop technology results in improved performance. | Gary McClellan | 51/6 | June 1980 |
| Professional drum synthesizer | Part 2—Final construction details. This unique device provides many of the features normally found on synthesizers costing several times more. | Steve Wood | 51/6 | June 1980 |
| Environmental control center | Technology and Mother Nature work together to reduce home heating and cooling costs. | Tom Stults | 51/7 | July 1980 |
| Home intercom system | Simple and inexpensive way to hear—and be heard—all through the house. | David J. Sweeney | 51/7 | July 1980 |
| Synthesized function generator | Part 2—Complete construction details. A professional-quality tool for the experimenter or technician. | Gary McClellan | 51/7 | July 1980 |
| Unicorn-1 robot | Part 1. Complete with manipulator arms and mobile base, you can build this robot for under $400. Various levels of control and intelligence are described, including an on-board computer. | James A. Gupton, Jr. | 51/8 | August 1980 |
| Raceway videogame | After you build this video game, you can pretend to be an Indy 500 race-car driver without ever leaving the comfort of your armchair. | L. Steven Cheairs | 51/8 | August 1980 |
| 6 audio test accessories | Construction details for 6 easy-to-build accessories for the audio test bench. Useful for troubleshooting or checking the performance of your hi-fi system. | Gary Stock | 51/8 | August 1980 |
| $10 logic probe | A necessary instrument for troubleshooting digital circuitry. | Fred Blechman | 51/8 | August 1980 |
| Unicorn-1 robot | Part 2. Assembling the manipulator arms and "hands." | James A. Gupton, Jr. | 51/9 | September 1980 |
| Wipeout videogame | Ten action-packed games in an arcade type videogame. Add on RF modulator and play it on your TV set. | L. Steven Cheairs | 51/9 | September 1980 |
| Synthesized function generator | This is a precision laboratory or test-bench instrument capable of accuracy to 0.005%. Use it with logic circuits or as an audio or RF signal generator. | Gary McClellan | 51/10 | October 1980 |
| Unicorn-1 robot | Part 3. Design and construction of the mobility base. | James A. Gupton, Jr. | 51/10 | October 1980 |
| Circuit design station | Prototype and debug your circuits using this battery-powered design station. | James Barbarello | 51/11 | November 1980 |
| Build your own robot | Part 4. Construction details for the body frame and body rotation mechanism. | James A. Gupton, Jr. | 51/11 | November 1980 |
| A byte of power AC controller | Interface card for your computer lets you independently switch on or off 8 AC power circuits. | L. Steven Cheairs | 51/11 | November 1980 |
| Low frequency converter | Add-on accessory extends the low-frequency range of the Synthesized Function Generator. | Gary McClellan | 51/12 | December 1980 |
| Mini-speaker system | A high-performance speaker system for your hi-fi in a mini-sized package. | Gary Stock | 51/12 | December 1980 |
| Build your own robot | Part 5: Construction details for completing the body and adding a voice. | James A. Gupton | 51/12 | December 1980 |
| Universal logic tester | A one-IC device that checks out not only components, but entire circuits. | Fred Blechman, K6UGT | 51/12 | December 1980 |

== 1981 ==
| Title | Description | Author | Issue | Publication date |
|---|---|---|---|---|
| Pay-TV decoder | Adaptor connects to the video-detector output inside your TV to descramble over-the-air pay-TV signals. | Ray Pichulo | 52/1 | January 1981 |
| Computer/TV interface | Adaptor lets you modify your TV set for use as a video monitor. | David E. Carter | 52/1 | January 1981 |
| Unicorn-1 robot | Modifying the arms to provide a twist-of-the-wrist function plus adding LED motor-direction indicators. | James A. Gupton, Jr. | 52/1 | January 1981 |
| Pay-TV decoder | Part 2—Construction details for an adaptor that connects to the video-detector output outside your TV to descramble over-the-air pay-TV signals. | Ray Pichulo | 52/2 | February 1981 |
| Unicorn-1 robot | Part 7—Construction details for an interface board that will permit motor control via remote control or an on-board computer. | James A. Gupton, Jr. | 52/2 | February 1981 |
| DMM accessory for ultra-low ohms | Add-on accessory for your DMM extends resistance measurements down to .0001 ohms. | J. T. Cataldo | 52/2 | February 1981 |
| PROM programmer | Program your own PROM's on your workbench with this inexpensive device. | T. E. LeVere | 52/2 | February 1981 |
| Audio signal restoration unit | Hear your records and tapes as you've never heard them before. | Joseph M. Gorin | 52/3 | March 1981 |
| Do-nothing box | Does "nothing" like you've never seen it done yet. | Noel Nyman | 52/3 | March 1981 |
| Unicorn-1 robot | The first step on the road to radio control. | James A. Gupton, Jr. | 52/3 | March 1981 |
| Computer-Selectric interface | An easy way to use an IBM Selectric terminal/printer for output from your computer. | E. G. Brooner | 52/4 | April 1981 |
| Unicorn-1 robot | Finishing up the conversion to radio control. | James A. Gupton, Jr. | 52/4 | April 1981 |
| Audio-signal restoration unit | Build this and "expand" your listening pleasure. | Joseph M. Gorin | 52/4 | April 1981 |
| Unicorn-1 robot—adding computer control | A look at the hardware and programming requirements needed to add computer control. | James A. Gupton, Jr. | 52/5 | May 1981 |
| LED VU meter for your hi-fi | Here's an all-electronic digital VU meter that you can add to your hi-fi system. | Bradley Albing | 52/5 | May 1981 |
| Computer-to-Selectric interface | Part 2—An inexpensive way to use an IBM Selectric typewriter as a hard copy printer for your computer. | E. G. Brooner | 52/5 | May 1981 |
| $60 modem | Give your computer a telephone interface. There's a lot waiting for it at the other end of the line. | Robert Ward | 52/6 | June 1981 |
| Lumitron-4 light sequencer | A four-channel light controller that will put many commercial disco installations to shame. | David L. Holmes | 52/6 | June 1981 |
| Unicorn-1 robot | Give your robot the senses of sight and touch. | James A. Gupton, Jr. | 52/6 | June 1981 |
| Negative ion generator | Negatively-charged oxygen is claimed to provide many benefits. Here's your chance to find out for yourself. | Ronald E. Pyle | 52/7 | July 1981 |
| $60 modem | The second part of this article winds up the construction phase of the project and introduces the software. | Robert Ward | 52/7 | July 1981 |
| Lumitron-4 light sequencer | Final construction and checkout and a fascinating light display. | David L. Holmes | 52/7 | July 1981 |
| Satellite TV antenna | The 8-Ball—a satellite TV antenna you can build for under $750. | H. D. McCullough | 52/8 | August 1981 |
| Synthesized RF generator | The Programma-2 covers a range of 300 kHz to 30 MHz and costs about $3100 less than its commercial counterparts. | Gary McClellan | 52/8 | August 1981 |
| Electronic musical horn | Don't blow your horn in traffic—play it! | Fred Blechman, David McDonald | 52/8 | August 1981 |
| $60 modem | Part 3—The conclusion of this article presents the software your computer will need to use the modem. | Robert Ward | 52/8 | August 1981 |
| UHF prescaler | Extend the range of your frequency counter up to 650 MHz. | Bill Owen | 52/8 | August 1981 |
| Hi-fi analog reverb system | Attach this to your hi-fi system and expand your listening room into a concert hall. | Carl Sawtell | 52/9 | September 1981 |
| Musical horn for your car | Part 2. Toot your own tune with this easy to build and install musical horn. PROM's allow you to program whatever tunes you like. | Fred Blechman, David McDonald | 52/9 | September 1981 |
| Satellite TV antenna | Part 2. Before you receive TV signals from satellites, you need an antenna. Here's an inexpensive design using commonly available materials. | H. D. McCullough | 52/9 | September 1981 |
| Synthesized RF generator | Part 2. Construction details for a 300 kHz to 30 MHz RF generator for your workbench. | Gary McClellan | 52/9 | September 1981 |
| Hi-fi analog reverb system | Part 2. Finishing up this audio-enhancement device that adds ambience to your listening room. | Carl Sawtell | 52/10 | October 1981 |
| Satellite TV antenna | Part 3. How to install and aim the 8-Ball spherical TVRO antenna. | H. D. McCullough | 52/10 | October 1981 |
| Low frequency filter | Eliminate the effects of annoying low-frequency record "noise" with this simple circuit. | Joseph M. Gorin | 52/11 | November 1981 |
| Expanded scale voltmeter | Here's a way for you to add super accuracy to your analog voltmeter. | T. J. Byers | 52/11 | November 1981 |
| Synthesized RF generator | Part 3. How to complete, calibrate and use the Programma-2. | Gary McClellan | 52/11 | November 1981 |
| Hi-fi decoder for discs | CBS's new noise-reduction system for phonograph records. Build yours today and take advantage of the new, noiseless CX-encoded discs. | Joel Cohen | 52/12 | December 1981 |
| 4 simple toys | Easy to build and yet entertaining to a youngster. They all make delightful presents for the holiday season. | Dan and Diane Talbot | 52/12 | December 1981 |
| Hi-fi mini-speaker | Small, efficient, and great sounding. Based on a patented principle that works. | George Pappanikolaou | 52/12 | December 1981 |
| LIMIK | Harmless insect-like gadget that is a sure-fire attention grabber. | Merritt Kappel | 52/12 | December 1981 |

== 1982 ==
| Title | Description | Author | Issue | Publication date |
|---|---|---|---|---|
| Video sync stabilizer | Accessory gadget for videocassete recorders displays rock-steady pictures from pre-recorded video tapes. | Gene Roseth | 53/1 | January 1982 |
| Hi-fi CX decoder for records | Part 2: CBS's new noise-reduction system for phonograph records. Build yours today and take advantage of the new noiseless discs. | Joel Cohen | 53/1 | January 1982 |
| PROM programmer | Self-contained 2716 programmer stores your programs in reusable EPROM's quickly and efficiently. | Robert N. Beaber | 53/2 | February 1982 |
| Digital thermometer | Easy-to-build thermometer for your home has a unique clear plastic enclosure. | Michael Rigsby | 53/2 | February 1982 |
| SAFE subwoofer | Based on the patented SAFE principle, this add-on speaker system provides extended bass response. | George Pappanikolaou | 53/2 | February 1982 |
| Telephone in-use monitor | A simple device to tell you when a multi-phone system is in use. | Christopher M. Dunn | 53/3 | March 1982 |
| UHF-TV antenna preamp | How to get 25 dB of gain on UHF channels. | Ray Pichulo | 53/3 | March 1982 |
| Video titler | Add titles to your home video movies with this microprocessor-based character and graphics generator. NTSC video output connects directly to your VCR. | Michel Champagne | 53/4 | April 1982 |
| Super siren | Multi-mode siren is a great add-on to your burglar-alarm system. | William D. Kraengel, Jr. | 53/4 | April 1982 |
| 6 unique projects for your car | Six projects for April 1. | Joseph Gartman, Martin Bradley Weinstein | 53/4 | April 1982 |
| Satellite TV receiver | A high quality receiver for under $500. Add an antenna and an LNA for a complete satellite earth station. | David Becker | 53/5 | May 1982 |
| Automatic power switcher | An easy-to-build elegant solution to having to throw multiple power switches. | Gary McClellan | 53/5 | May 1982 |
| UHF-TV preamp | Part 2: Improve UHF reception with this 2-stage amplifier. | Ray Pichulo | 53/5 | May 1982 |
| Video titler | Part 2: Add titles to your home video movies with this alphanumeric character and graphics generator. | Michel Champagne | 53/5 | May 1982 |
| Stereo image expander | Turn your listening room into a "sonic stage" with this easy-to-use imager. | Joel Cohen | 53/6 | June 1982 |
| Pocket calculator | Use it to check and maintain the accuracy of your test instruments. | Gary McClellan | 53/6 | June 1982 |
| Satellite TV receiver | Part 2: Complete construction plans for this under-$500 device. | David Becker | 53/6 | June 1982 |
| Gated IF amplifier | Locks in on weak UHF sync pulses for a rock-steady picture. | Stephan B. Miller | 53/6 | June 1982 |
| Speech synthesizer | Add a voice to your projects with just 5 IC's. | Steven Cheairs | 53/7 | July 1982 |
| Satellite TV receiver | Part 3—Testing and alignment procedures concludes this 3-part construction article. | David Becker | 53/7 | July 1982 |
| Energy miser | Bring down the high cost of heating. | Roland Gibson | 53/8 | August 1982 |
| Heart-rate monitor | Know the state of your health and fitness. This project displays your heart rate in beats-per-minute by simply attaching an opto-electronic sensor to your finger. | Robert Grossblatt | 53/9 | September 1982 |
| Picture phone | Part 2—Adapter sends video pictures over the telephone line to a remote location. | Josef Bernard | 53/9 | September 1982 |
| Stereo image expander | Part 2—Hi-fi adapter adds an extra dimension to your recorded music. | Joel Cohen | 53/9 | September 1982 |
| Picture phone | Part 3: Winding up the theory and beginning construction. | Josef Bernard | 53/10 | October 1982 |
| Frequency multiplier for your counter | Add-on for your counter multiplies the signal frequency by either 10 or 100. This easy-to-build device increases the low-frequency range and accuracy of your counter. | Gary McClellan | 53/11 | November 1982 |
| Picture phone | Final construction details as well as calibration, set-up, and use for this adapter that sends video signals over your telephone line. | Josef Bernard | 53/11 | November 1982 |
| Heart-rate monitor | Final construction details for a device that measures your heart rate and displays it on a digital display in beats-per-minute. | Robert Grossblatt | 53/11 | November 1982 |
| Guitar and bass tuner | Easy-to-build musical "pitch pipe" that enables you to tune your guitar and bass instruments quickly. | James I. Jarnagin | 53/11 | November 1982 |
| Automatic commercial editor | Make commercial-free tapes of your favorite old black-and-white movies. | Gary McClellan | 53/12 | December 1982 |

== 1983 ==
| Title | Description | Author | Issue | Publication date |
|---|---|---|---|---|
| Programma III digital IC tester | A versatile device that puts IC's through their paces and indicates how they function. | Gary McClellan | 54/1 | January 1983 |
| Low-band converter | Many interesting things happen on the frequencies below the AM broadcast-band. Build this converter and find out for yourself what they are. | Stan Gibilisco | 54/1 | January 1983 |
| Atari videogame controller | Unique controller replaces your Atari joysticks and uses position-sensitive mercury switch for a new dimension in game playing. | David J. Sweeney | 54/2 | February 1983 |
| Automatic commercial editor | Part 2—Add-on device for your VCR automatically eliminates commercials from your favorite black-and-white movies. | Gary McClellan | 54/2 | February 1983 |
| Digital IC tester | Part 2—A versatile tester that puts IC's through their paces and indicates how they function. | Gary McClellan | 54/2 | February 1983 |
| Digital IC tester | Part 3. A versatile device that puts IC's through their paces and indicates how they function. | Gary McClellan | 54/3 | March 1983 |
| Two compact DVM's | Two inexpensive DVM circuits for your workbench. | Clement S. Pepper | 54/3 | March 1983 |
| Add a video input to your TV | Modify your television set to accept a baseband video signal for better picture quality when using a computer or VCR. | John Soluk | 54/4 | April 1983 |
| Build your own custom cases | Give your projects a profession look with custom-built cases. | Robert Grossblatt | 54/4 | April 1983 |
| VLF-HF active antennas | Part 3. These short-length antennas are easy to build and offer surprisingly good performance. | R. W. Burhans | 54/4 | April 1983 |
| Spot-a-matic | An illuminating project. | Robert Grossblatt | 54/4 | April 1983 |
| Talking alarm clock | Only a few IC's are needed to build a clock that really tells time. | Lee Glinski | 54/5 | May 1983 |
| Car burglar alarm | An inexpensive form of insurance that can avert an automobile break-in. | Edward W. Loxterkamp | 54/5 | May 1983 |
| VLF-HF passive antenna tuner | Another approach to optimizing reception at very-low frequencies. | R. W. Burhans | 54/5 | May 1983 |
| Audio frequency-response meter | Quickly and accurately find the frequency response of your amplifiers, tape recorders, and other audio equipment with this useful device. | Ray Fish | 54/6 | June 1983 |
| Expand your Timex/Sinclair operating system | Upgrade your computer with 8K of battery-backed-up CMOS RAM. | Paul W. W. Hunter | 54/7 | July 1983 |
| Talking alarm clock | Part 2. With this fun project you'll never have to tell time again. | Lee Glinski | 54/7 | July 1983 |
| Digital voltmeter for your car's dashboard | This easy-to-build project helps keep an eye on your car's electrical system. | Fred L. Young Sr., Fred L. Young Jr. | 54/7 | July 1983 |
| Timex/Sinclair memory expansion | Part 2. Finishing up construction, and a number of useful machine-language utilities you can store in your add-on RAM. | Paul W. W. Hunter | 54/8 | August 1983 |
| Digital temperature gauge | This valuable accessory for your car can also be used anywhere you need a remote temperature display. | Fred L. Young Sr., Fred L. Young Jr. | 54/8 | August 1983 |
| Mini player-piano | A music box that can "remember" up to four tunes. | Robert Grossblatt | 54/9 | September 1983 |
| Powerline transient suppressor | Keep your computer and its contents safe with this simple yet effective device. | Herb Friedman | 54/9 | September 1983 |
| Digital pressure gauge for your car | A handy instrument that can warn you of problems before they become critical. | Fred L. Young Sr., Fred L. Young Jr. | 54/9 | September 1983 |
| Mini player-piano | Part 2. Winding up the theory and beginning construction. | Robert Grossblatt | 54/10 | October 1983 |
| Hi-fi sound converter for your TV | Get sound quality you never dreamed possible with this easy-to-build, easy-to-install project. | Gary McClellan | 54/11 | November 1983 |
| Voice-operated switch for your tape recorder | Get "hands-off" operation for your tape recorder with this simple yet effective device. | James P. Reed | 54/11 | November 1983 |
| Mini player-piano | Part 3. How to use this fascinating conversation piece. | Robert Grossblatt | 54/11 | November 1983 |
| Typewriter-to-computer interface | Now you can get letter-quality printing on a budget by using your IBM typewriter as a printer—with a 30K buffer! | Bill Green | 54/12 | December 1983 |
| Interference traps for SWL's | If you're bothered by interference from local broadcast-band stations, here's something you can do about it. | R. W. Burhans | 54/12 | December 1983 |

== 1985 ==
| Title | Description | Author | Issue | Publication date |
|---|---|---|---|---|
| Computer-Controlled Robot Arm | Control an Armatron robot arm with your computer. | Jimmy Banas | 56/5 | May 1985 |
