= Structures for lossless ion manipulations =

Structures for lossless ion manipulations (SLIM) are a form of ion optics to which various radio frequency and dc electric potentials can be applied and used to enable a broad range of ion manipulations, such as separations based upon ion mobility spectrometry, reactions (unimolecular, ion-molecule, and ion-ion), and storage (i.e. ion trapping). SLIM was developed by Richard D. Smith and coworkers at Pacific Northwest National Laboratory (PNNL) and are generally fabricated from arrays of electrodes on evenly spaced planar surfaces. In 2017, Erin S. Baker, Sandilya Garimella, Yehia Ibrahim, Richard D. Smith and Ian Webb from the Interactive Omics Group of PNNL received the R&D 100 Award for the development of SLIM.

In SLIM, ions move in the space between the two surfaces, in directions controlled using electric fields, and also moved between different of multi-level SLIM, as can be constructed from a stack of printed circuit boards (PCBs). The lossless nature of SLIM is derived from the use of rf electric fields, and particularly the pseudo potential derived from the inhomogeneous electric fields resulting from rf of appropriate frequency applied to multiple adjacent electrodes, and that serves to prevent ions from closely approaching the electrodes and surface where loss would conventionally be expected. SLIM are generally used in conjunction with mass spectrometry for analytical applications.

== Construction ==
The first SLIM were fabricated using PCB technology to demonstrate a range of simple ion manipulations in gases at low pressures (a few torr). This SLIM technology has conceptual similarities with integrated electronic circuits, but instead of moving electrons, electric fields were used to create pathways, switches, etc. to manipulate ions in the gas phase.

SLIM devices can enable complex sequences of ion separations, transfers and trapping to occur in the space between two surfaces positioned (e.g., ~4 mm apart) and each patterned with conductive electrodes. The SLIM devices use the inhomogeneous electric fields created by arrays of closely spaced electrodes to which readily generated peak-to-peak RF voltages (e.g., Vp-p ~ 100 V; ~ 1 MHz) are applied with opposite polarity on adjacent electrodes to create effective potential fields that prevent ions from approaching the surfaces. The operating pressure for SLIM devices has initially been reported to be in the 1-10 torr range which allows ions to be effectively confined using the previously defined RF potentials. At higher pressures, the capacity to confine ions diminishes without additional forces being placed on the ion populations.

The confinement functions over a range of pressures (<0.1 torr to ~50 torr), and over an adjustable mass-to-charge ratio (m/z) range (e.g., m/z 200 to >2000). This effective potential works in conjunction with DC potentials applied to side electrodes to prevent ion losses, and allows creating ion traps and conduits in the gap between the two surfaces for the effectively lossless storage and movement of ions as a result of any gradient in the applied DC fields.

The two mirrored halves of a SLIM system are shown in the example to the left. Compared to the longer pathlength systems developed at PNNL, this board is considerably shorter but serves as a rapid prototype. When folded together and spaced ~3 mm apart, the co-planar electrode surfaces create the fields needed for ion confinement and separation.

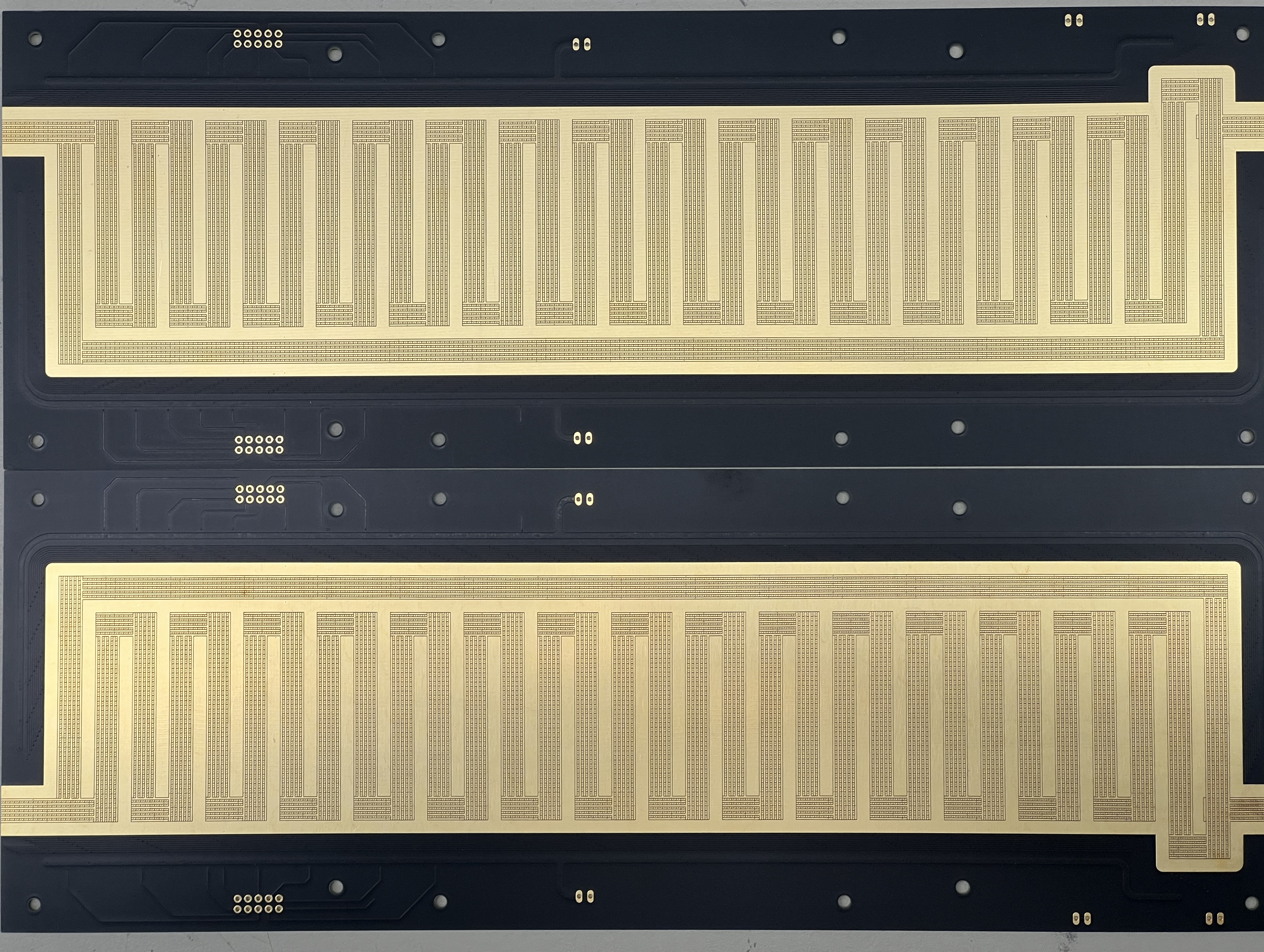
Mirrored halves of the PCBs comprising a SLIM setup.
