= Discontinuous electrophoresis =

Type of laboratory technique

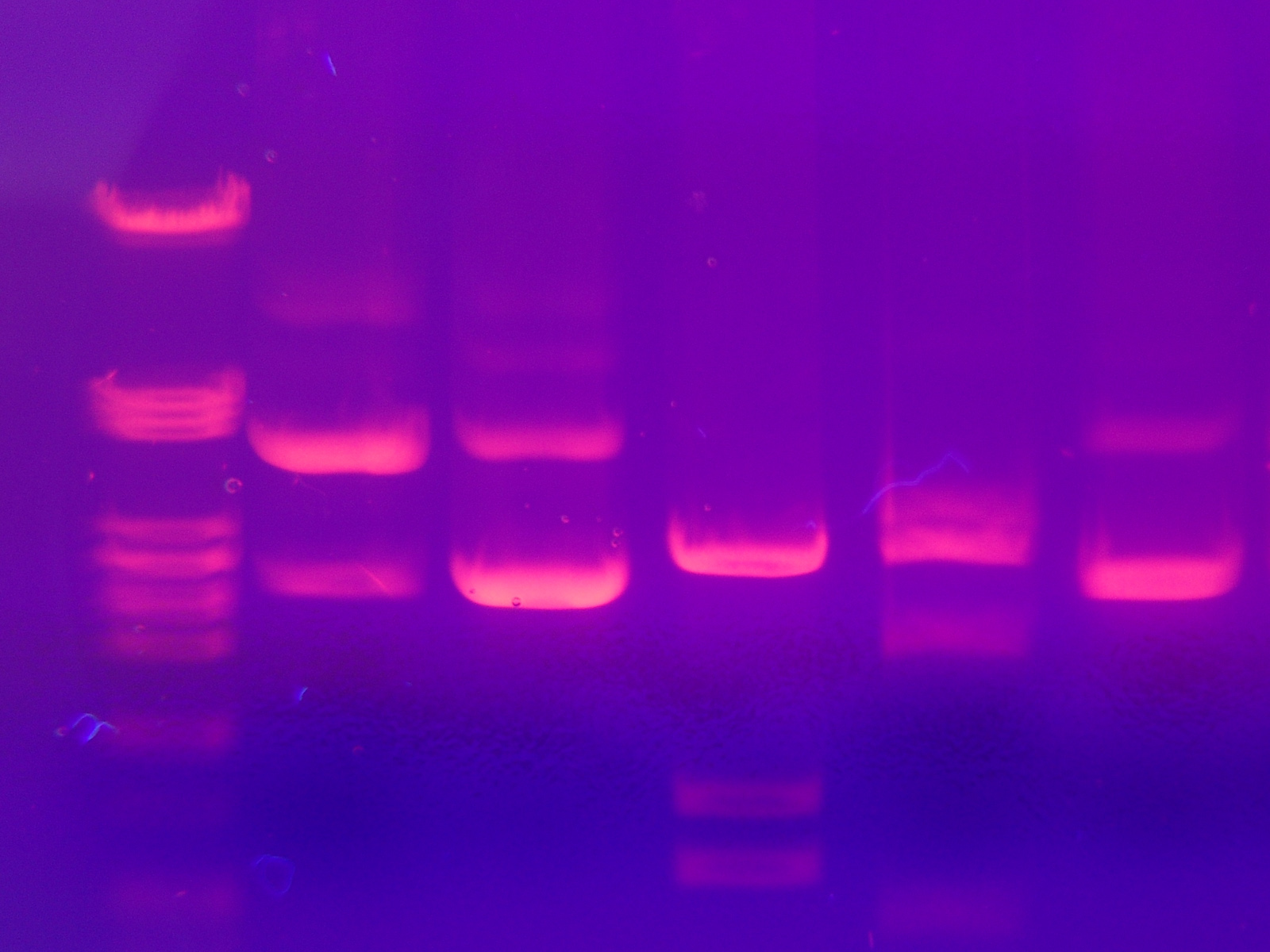
DNA bands after electrophoresis

Discontinuous electrophoresis (colloquially disc electrophoresis (Note: Ornstein derived the name disc electrophoresis from: "the dependence of the new technique on discontinuities in the electrophoretic matrix and, coincidentally, from the discoid shape of the separated zones of ions in the standard form of our technique.")) is a type of polyacrylamide gel electrophoresis. It was developed by Ornstein and Davis. This method produces high resolution and good band definition. It is widely used technique for separating proteins according to size and charge.

== Method ==
In this method, the gel is divided into two discontinuous parts, resolving and stacking gel, both have different concentrations of polyacrylamide. The one with lower concentration is stacked on top of the one with higher concentration. Discontinuity is based on four parameters: gel structure, pH value of the buffer, ionic strength of the buffer, and the nature of the ions in the gel and electrode buffer. The electrode buffer contains glycine. Glycine has very low net charge at pH 6.8 of stacking gel, so it has low mobility. The proteins are separated according to the principle of isotachophoresis and form stacks in the order of mobility (stacking effect). Mobility depends on net charge, not on the size of the molecule. Proteins move towards anode slowly at constant speed till they reach limit of separation gel. Suddenly, frictional resistance increases but glycine is not affected and it passes the proteins and becomes highly charged in resolving zone. Proteins present in homogeneous buffer start to separate based on principles of zone electrophoresis. Now their mobility depends on size as well as charge. pH value rises to 9.5 and net charge increases.

== See also ==
- Affinity electrophoresis
- SDS-PAGE
- Isotachophoresis
