= Ion funnel =

Device used to focus a beam of ions

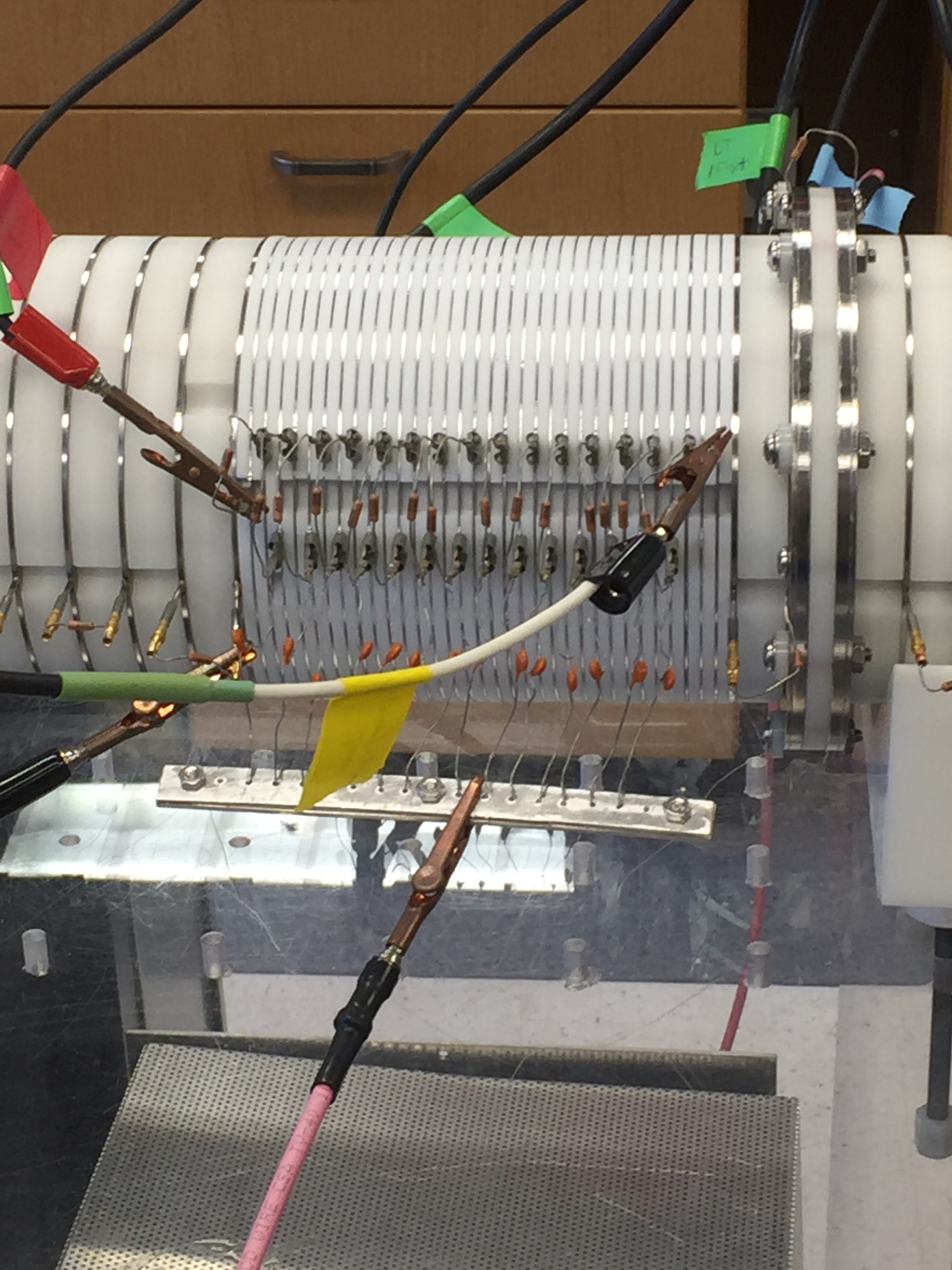
A picture of an ion funnel attached to an instrument.

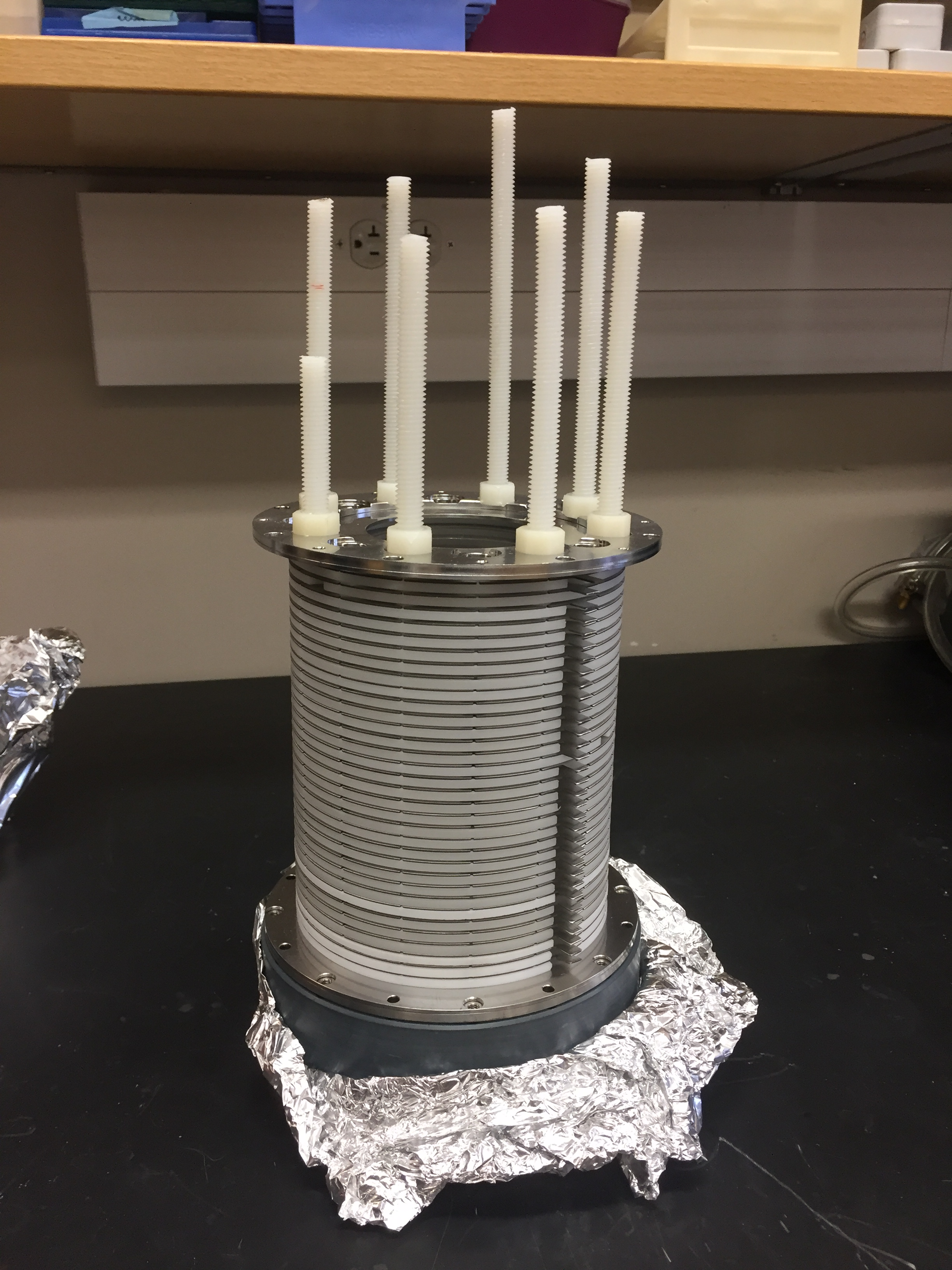
A side view of an ion funnel. Each electrode (metal disk) is visible from the outside.

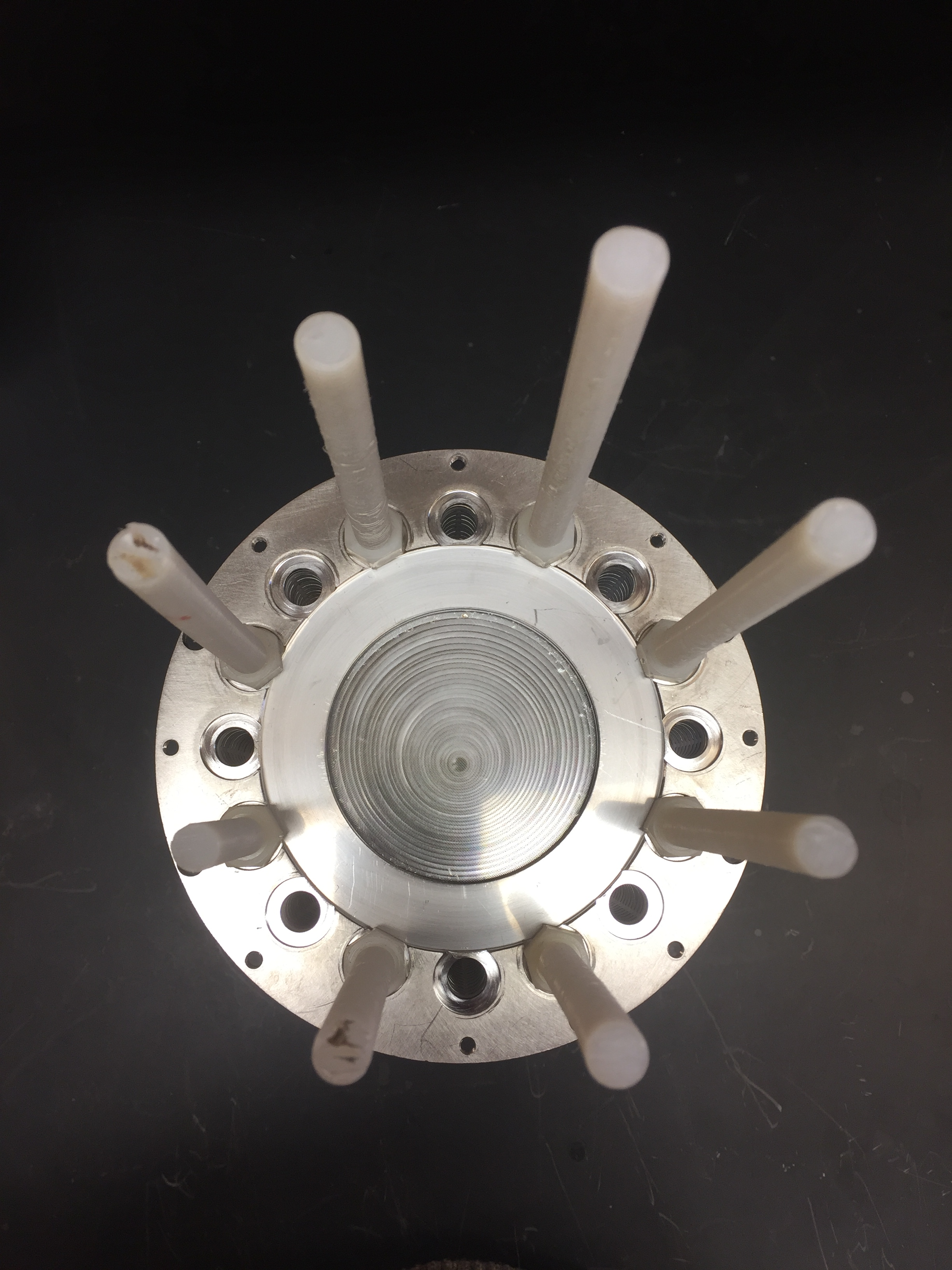
A top-down view of an ion funnel. The decreasing radii of the electrodes is visible from this angle.

In mass spectrometry, an ion funnel is a device used to focus a beam of ions using a series of stacked ring electrodes with decreasing inner diameter. A combined radio frequency and fixed electrical potential is applied to the grids. In electrospray ionization-mass spectrometry (ESI-MS), ions are created at atmospheric pressure, but are analyzed at subsequently lower pressures. Ions can be lost while they are shuttled from areas of higher to lower pressure due to the transmission process caused by a phenomenon called Joule expansion or “free-jet expansion.” These ion clouds expand outward, which limits the amount of ions that reach the detector, so fewer ions are analyzed. The ion funnel refocuses and transmits ions efficiently from those areas of high to low pressure.

== History ==
The first ion funnel was created in 1997 in the Environmental Molecular Sciences Laboratory Pacific Northwest National Laboratory by the researchers in Richard D. Smith's lab. The ion funnel was implemented to replace the ion transmission-limited skimmer for more efficient ion capture in an ESI source. Many characteristics of the ion funnel are attributed to the stacked ring ion guide, however, the disks of an ion funnel vary in diameter down its long axis. There is a portion at the base of the ion funnel in which a series of cylindrical ring electrodes have decreasing diameters, which enables the ion cloud entering the ion funnel to be spatially dispersed. This allows for efficient transfer of the ion cloud through the conductance limiting orifice at the exit as the ion cloud becomes focused to a much smaller radial size. The DC electric field serves to push ions through the funnel. For positive ions, the front plate of the funnel has the most positive DC voltage, and subsequent plates have gradually decreasing DC components, providing added control. RF and DC electric fields are co-applied with a pseudopotential created with alternating RF polarities on adjacent electrodes. This “pseudo-potential” radially confines ions and causes instability in ions with a lower m/z (mass to charge ratio) while ions with a higher m/z are focused to the center of the funnel. The initial ion funnel design used in the Smith research lab proved inefficient for collecting ions with low m/z. Simulations suggest that decreasing the spacing between the lenses so that they are less than the diameter of the smallest ring electrode could be a plausible solution to this problem. Another issue with the design is that the funnel is susceptible to noise with fast neutrals and charged droplets at many atmospheric interfaces during the initial vacuum phase. Modifications increase the efficiency and signal to noise ratio of the ion funnel.

Some of the earliest ion funnels struggled to control gas flow as the pressure in the ion vacuum chamber was not uniform due to gas dynamic effects. The pressure at the funnel's exit was estimated to be 2 to 3 times higher than the pressure from the pressure gauge. The higher pressure required greater pumping in downstream vacuum chambers to compensate for the larger injection of gas. The discrepancy between the measured pressure and the pressure at the exit of the funnel was caused by the a sizable portion of the supersonic gas jet from the injector continuing beyond the Mach disk or shock diamond at the beginning of the funnel and continuing through until the end. The most effective resolution is the us of a jet disrupter that consists of a 9 mm diameter brass disk suspended perpendicular to the gas flow in the center of the ion funnel.

== Applications ==
=== Mass spectrometry ===
Ion funnels are frequently used in mass spectroscopy devices to collect ions from an ionization source. Previous devices lacking an ion funnel often lost ions during the transition from ionization source to the detector of the mass spectrometer. This loss was due to the increasing number of collisions undergone by ions with other gas molecules present in the atmosphere. The introduction of the ion funnel greatly reduced the amount of ions lost during experiments by guiding ions towards a desired destination, and through modification of the number of inlets is also able to increases sensitivity of measurements taken by the mass spectrometer. Multiple inlets allow multiple electrospray emitters, reducing the flow through each individual emitter. This creates many highly efficient electrosprays at low flow rates. Multiple inlets also improve sensitivity, with a linearly arranged 19 electrospray emitter coupled to 19 inlets operating at 18 Torr giving a nine-fold increase compared to a single inlet.

=== Proton transfer reaction chamber ===
Proton transfer reaction mass spectrometry has traditionally used drift tubes as ion traps. However, radio frequency ion funnels offer an attractive alternative, as they improve compound specific sensitivity significantly. This is due to increasing the effective reaction time and focusing the ions. The same pressure ranges are required for ion funnels and drift tubes, so the technology is not difficult to implement. Ion funnels have been shown to favor transmission of ions with high m/z.

=== Breath analysis ===
Breath analysis is a convenient and non-invasive way to detect chemicals in a bodily system such as alcohol content to determine intoxication, monitor the levels of anesthetics in the body during surgical procedures, and identify performance-enhancing substances in the system of athletes. However, conventional techniques are ineffective at low concentrations. An electrospray ionization interface assisted by an ion funnel used in a linear trap quadrupole Fourier-transform ion cyclotron resonance mass spectrometer was shown to greatly increase sensitivity with high resolution.

== See also ==
- Electrostatic lens
- Reflectron
