= Jet disrupter =

Ion funnel component

In mass spectrometry, jet disrupters are specialized electrodes within ion funnels that counteract the effects of directed gas flow. Acting as physical barriers to neutral molecules, they disperse gas molecules and charged droplets while improving ion transmission and reducing vacuum system demands.

== Development and functionality ==
The development of the jet disrupter stemmed from the discovery that directed gas flow continued beyond both the capillary inlet and the ion funnel exit. This persistence caused inaccurate pressure readings, contamination of mass spectrometer components, increased background noise, and placed greater demand on downstream vacuum pumps. To address these challenges posed by non-uniform gas pressures within ion funnels, the jet disrupter was introduced.

The first jet disrupter was developed by Taeman Kim, consisting of a 9-mm brass disk positioned 22 mm downstream of the first ion funnel electrode. Operating at a higher voltage than the adjacent ring electrodes, this configuration enabled ions to be deflected around the electrode while causing neutral molecules and charged droplets to disperse and more efficiently be removed by vacuum pumps. Implementation of the jet disrupter in ion funnels yielded several improvements: downstream vacuum chamber pressure was reduced by a factor of 2-3, ion transmission improved by 15%, and MS/MS spectra demonstrated enhanced signal-to-noise ratios, increasing between 5.3 and 14.1-fold (depending on sample concentrations).

Furthermore, jet disrupters can function as ion valves. By modulating the applied voltage, it is possible to control the transmission efficiency of ions through the funnel. This capability is particularly valuable for reducing the relative intensity of highly abundant analyte ions, which can rapidly fill ion trap analyzers and cause unwanted space charging effects, which occur when excessive ion populations degrade mass analyzer performance. Their application into ion cyclotron resonance (ICR) cells helped maintain optimal ion populations, improving mass accuracy and sensitivity. The valve-like properties have also proven beneficial in dual-channel ion funnel designs, where a jet disrupter can modulate the flow of ions from one channel without affecting the ion transmission efficiency of the other.

== Problems and alternative technologies ==
While jet disrupters effectively manage directed gas flow and improve ion transmission, they face several operational challenges. Over time, the electrode surface becomes contaminated through exposure to liquid droplets and neutral molecules. Moreover, since jet disrupters cannot completely block these particles, some inevitably pass through to downstream components of the mass spectrometer, gradually degrading signal quality and necessitating periodic maintenance or cleaning.

An alternative approach involves orthogonal ion injection, where the capillary input is orthogonally aligned with the ion funnel axis. Instead of using a physical barrier like a jet disrupter, this configuration allows the ion funnel to capture ions while naturally directing gas flow toward an outlet away from the funnel. This design effectively separates the gas dynamics from the ion path while maintaining ion transmission.
