= Isotachophoresis =

Separation technique used in analytical chemistry

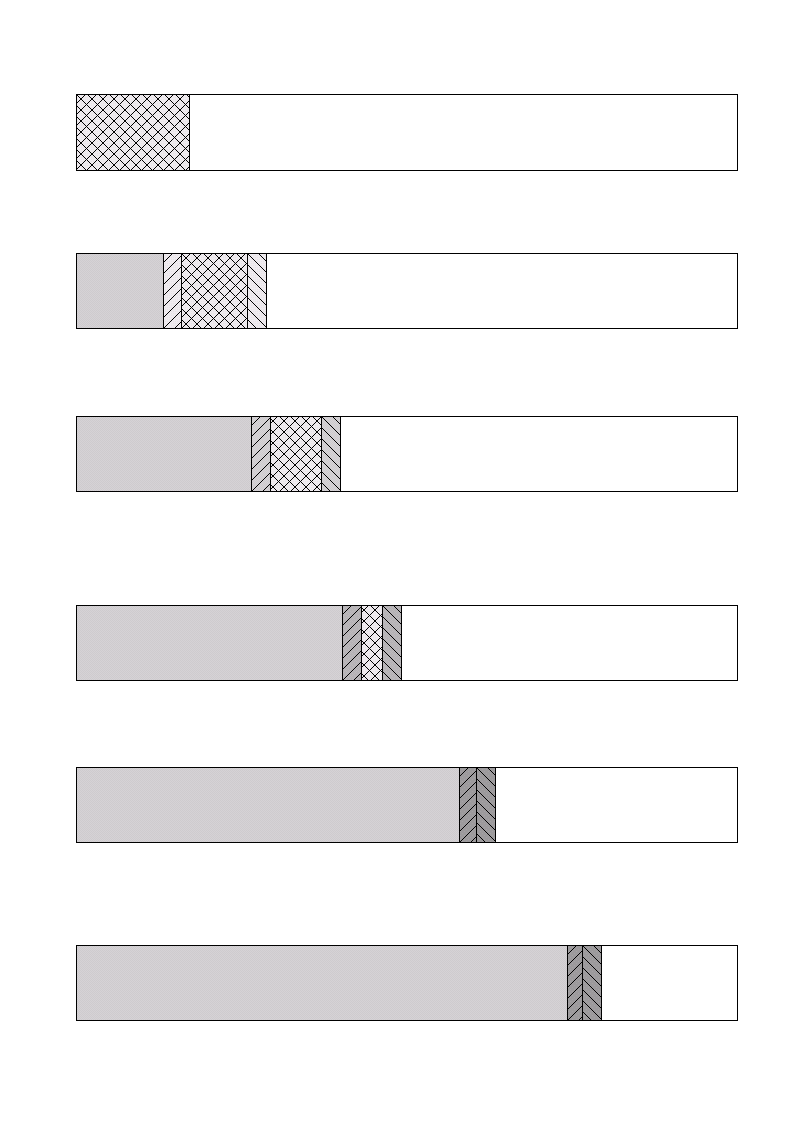
Stadia during an ITP separation of a mix of two analytes. White: leading electrolyte; gray: terminating electrolyte; hatched: the analytes

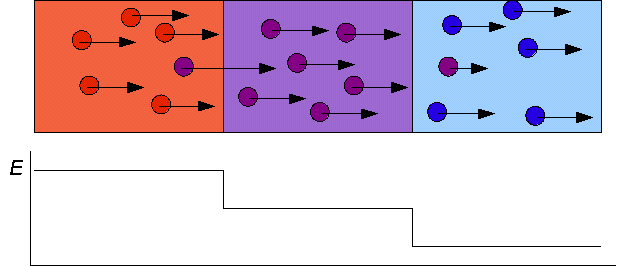
The self-sharpening effect in ITP: due to a difference in electrical field, an ion will move faster when it comes in the previous zone, and slower when it comes in the next zone. Therefore, it will return to its own zone. Below the corresponding electrical field for each zone

Isotachophoresis (ITP) is a technique in analytical chemistry used for selective separation and concentration of ionic analytes. It is a form of electrophoresis; charged analytes are separated based on ionic mobility, a quantity which tells how fast an ion migrates through an electric field.

== Overview ==
In conventional ITP separations, a discontinuous buffer system is used. The sample is introduced between a zone of fast leading electrolyte (LE) and a zone of slow terminating (or: trailing) electrolyte (TE). Usually, the LE and the TE have a common counterion, but the co-ions (having charges with the same sign as the analytes of interest) are different: the LE is defined by co-ions with high ionic mobility, while the TE is defined by co-ions with low ionic mobility. The analytes of interest have intermediate ionic mobility. Application of an electric potential results in a low electrical field in the leading electrolyte and a high electrical field in the terminating electrolyte. Analyte ions situated in the TE zone will migrate faster than the surrounding TE co-ions, while analyte ions situated in the LE will migrate slower; the result is that analytes are focused at the LE/TE interface.

ITP is a displacement method: focusing ions of a certain kind displace other ions. If present in sufficient amounts, focusing analyte ions can displace all electrolyte co-ions, reaching a plateau concentration. Multiple analytes with sufficiently different ionic mobilities will form multiple plateau zones. Indeed, plateau mode ITP separations are readily recognized by stairlike profiles, each plateau of the stair representing an electrolyte or analyte zone having (from LE to TE) increasing electric fields and decreasing conductivities. In peak mode ITP, analytes amounts are insufficient to reach plateau concentrations, such analytes will focus in sharp Gaussian-like peaks. In peak mode ITP, analyte peaks will strongly overlap, unless so-called spacer compounds are added with intermediate ionic mobilities between those of the analytes; such spacer compounds are able to segregate adjacent analyte zones.

A completed ITP separation is characterized by a dynamic equilibrium in which all coionic zones migrate with equal velocities. From this phenomenon ITP has obtained its name: iso = equal, tachos = speed, phoresis = migration.

Isotachophoresis is exactly equal to the steady-state-stacking step in discontinuous electrophoresis.

== Transient ITP ==
A popular form of ITP is transient ITP (tITP). It alleviates the limitation of conventional ITP that it has limited separation capacity because of analyte zone overlap. In transient ITP, analytes are first concentrated by ITP, and then can be baseline separated by zone electrophoresis. Transient ITP is usually accomplished by dissolving the sample in the TE and sandwiching the sample/TE plug between LE zones - or vice versa: a sample/LE plug can also be sandwiched between TE zones. In the first case, analytes are focused at the front TE/LE interface. Meanwhile, the back of the TE plug becomes dissolved in the LE because the faster LE ions overcome the TE ions. When all of the TE ions are dissolved, the focusing process ceases and the analytes are separated according to the principles of zone electrophoresis.

tITP is nowadays more widespread than conventional ITP because it is easily implemented in capillary electrophoresis (CE) separations as a preconcentration step, making CE more sensitive while profiting from its powerful separation capacities.
