= Logic probe =

Handheld electronic test equipment

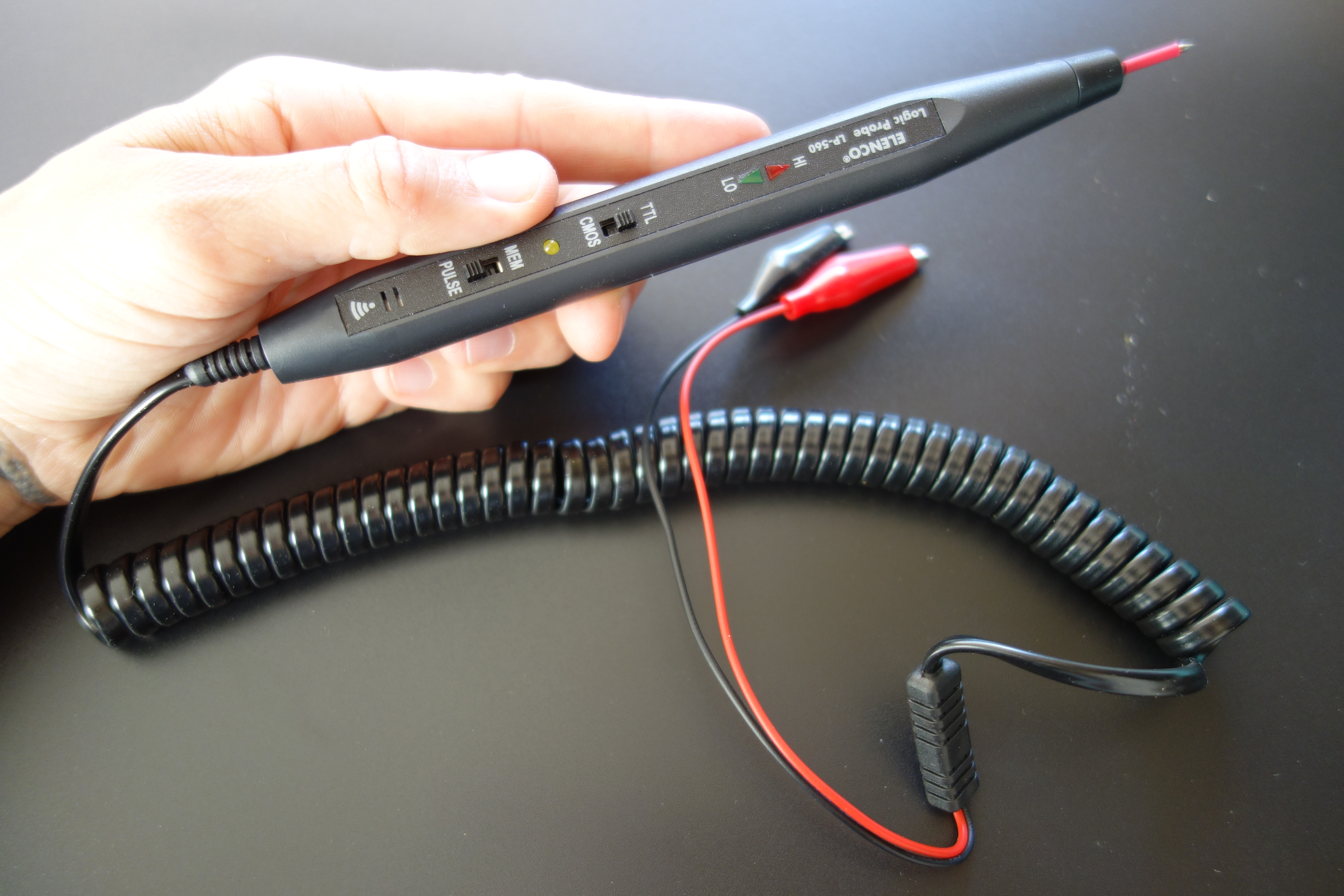
Elenco LP-560 logic probe. It has a red LED for high state, green LED for low state, amber LED for pulsing state, and a changing audible tone.

A logic probe is a low-cost hand-held test probe used for analyzing and troubleshooting the logical states (boolean 0 or 1) of a digital circuit. When many signals need to be observed or recorded simultaneously, a logic analyzer is used instead.

== Overview ==
While most logic probes are powered by the circuit under test, some devices use batteries. They can be used on either TTL (transistor-transistor logic) or CMOS (complementary metal-oxide semiconductor) logic integrated circuit devices, such as 7400-series, 4000 series, and newer logic families that support similar voltages.

Most modern logic probes typically have one or more LEDs on the body of the probe:

- an LED to indicate a high (1) logic state.
- an LED to indicate a low (0) logic state.
- an LED to indicate changing back and forth between low and high states. The pulse-detecting electronics usually has a pulse-stretcher circuit so that even very short pulses become visible on the LED.

A control on the logic probe allows either the capture and storage of a single event or continuous running.

When the logic probe is either connected to an invalid logic level (a fault condition or a tri-stated output) or not connected at all, none of the LEDs light up.

Another control on the logic probe allow selection of either TTL or CMOS family logic. This is required as these families have different thresholds for the logic-high (V_{IH}) and logic-low (V_{IL}) circuit voltages.

Some logic probes have an audible tone, of which vary across models. A model may 1) emit a tone for high logic state otherwise no tone, or 2) emit a higher frequency tone for a high logic state, lower frequency tone for a low logic state, and no tone for no connection or tri-state. An oscillating signal causes the probe to alternate between high-state and low-state tones.

== History ==
The logic probe was invented by Gary Gordon in 1968 while he was employed by Hewlett-Packard.
