= Gary Babcock Gordon =

Gary Gordon
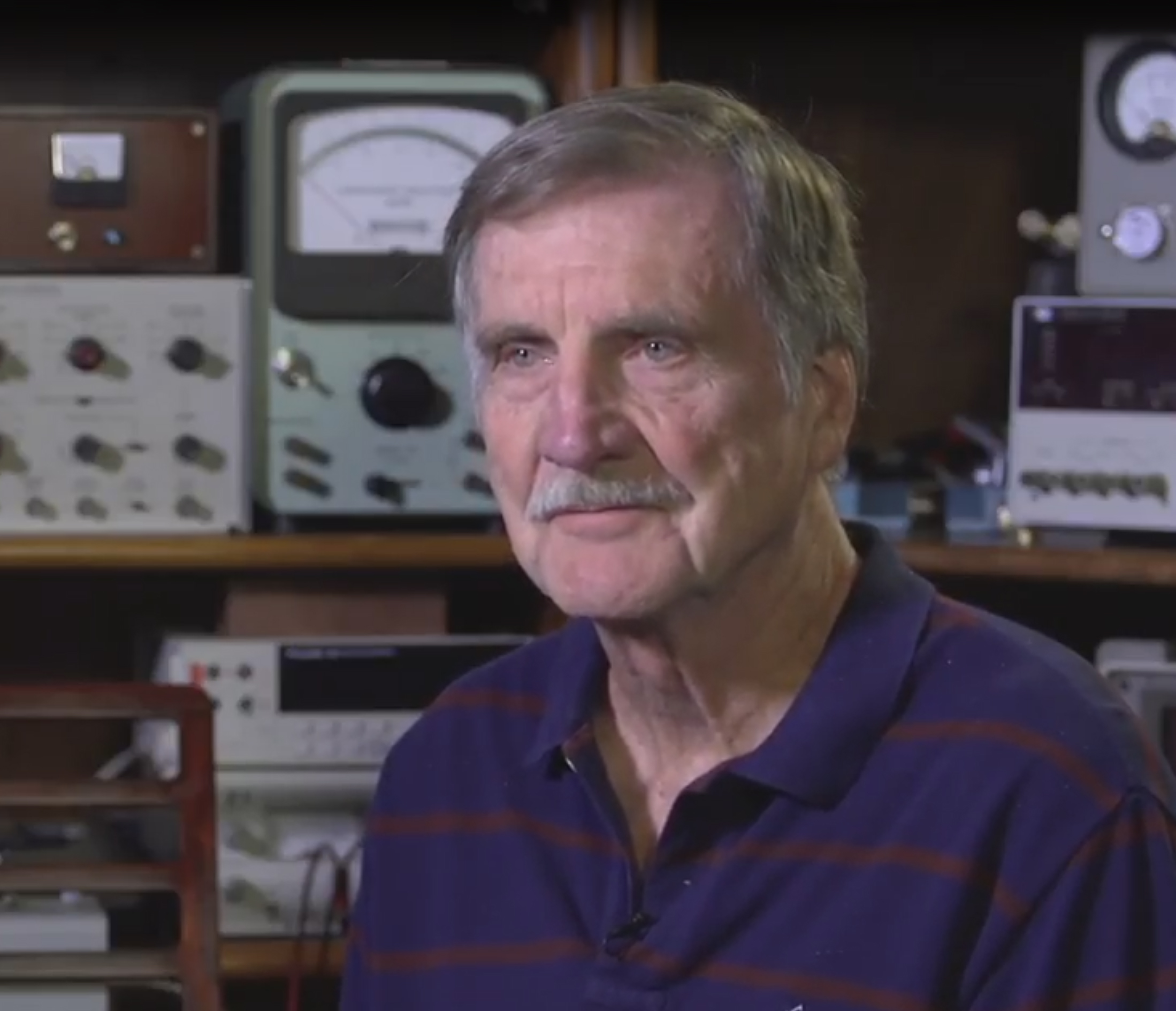
- Born: November 16, 1939 Portland, Oregon
- Education: U.C. Berkeley BSEE Stanford MSEE
- Spouse: Nicola Whitney Gordon

Gary Gordon is a retired engineer, naval officer, associate professor at San Jose State University, Agilent Technologies Fellow, and co-founder of Cambotics, a company pioneering robotic studio camera dollies.

He is a named inventor on over 100 patents including the modern optical computer mouse, and his works have been featured on over 20 journal and magazine covers. At Hewlett Packard he pioneered instrumentation for testing computer circuits including the first Logic Probe, Logic Clip, Logic Pulser, and HP's first Logic Analyzer. Subsequently he led a number of significant projects including HP's distance-measuring laser interferometer, the ORCA Robot, and various instruments used in analytical chemistry and bioscience. His research also included computer input devices, and in 1999 he was awarded HP's first annual Prize for Innovation for co-inventing the modern optical computer mouse which measures travel by correlating successive images of the work surface.

His philanthropic interests include writing eye tracking software for controlling a screen cursor with one's gaze and the SoftSwitch input device, both for paralyzed computer users, teaching radio technology at Handiham radio camps, and creating a short video showcasing their work.

In 2017 the Computer History Museum produced a 45 minute video and transcript chronicling Gordon's career and his contributions to the development of digital computers.
