= Michael T. Bowers =

American chemist (born 1939)

- Born: 1939 (age 86–87)
- Education: Gonzaga University; University of Illinois Urbana-Champaign
- Known for: Mass Spectrometry
- Scientific career
- Fields: Chemist
- Workplaces: UC Santa Barbara

Michael T. Bowers (born 1939) is an American chemist and professor at the University of California, Santa Barbara.

== Career ==
He graduated with a B.S. from Gonzaga University in 1962 and then graduated with a Ph.D. from the University of Illinois Urbana-Champaign in 1966.

He worked at the Jet Propulsion Laboratory in California for 2 years before joining UC Santa Barbara in 1968, where he was appointed full professor in 1976.

Bowers group uses mass spectrometry and ion mobility spectrometry to study gaseous species and determine their structure, reaction dynamics and mechanism.

== Awards ==
- Fellow of the American Chemical Society (ACS)
- 1987 Elected Fellow of the American Physical Society "for outstanding contributions both theoretically and experimentally on the Mechanism and Dynamics of Ion-Molecule Reactions"
- 1994 Guggenheim Fellowship
- 1994 Fellow of the American Association for the Advancement of Science
- 1996 Frank H. Field and Joe L. Franklin Award of the American Chemical Society
- 1997 Thomson Medal of the International Mass Spectrometry Foundation
- 2004 Distinguished Contribution in Mass Spectrometry Award

== See also ==
- Gas phase ion chemistry
