= Richard D. Smith =

American chemist

- Born: North Andover, Massachusetts
- Education: University of Utah
- Known for: Ion funnel, Electrospray ionization, Mass spectrometry, Capillary electrophoresis-mass spectrometry, Proteomics
- Awards: 2003 ACS Award for Analytical Chemistry; 2009 HUPO Discovery Award in Proteomics Sciences; R&D Magazine Scientist of the Year (2010); 2013 American Society for Mass Spectrometry Distinguished Contribution in Mass Spectrometry Award
- Scientific career
- Fields: Chemistry; Proteomics
- Workplaces: Pacific Northwest National Laboratory
- Thesis: Studies in ion cyclotron resonance mass spectrometry (1975)
- Doctoral advisor: Jean Futrell

Richard Dale Smith is a chemist and a Battelle Fellow and chief scientist within the biological sciences division, as well as the director of proteomics research at the Pacific Northwest National Laboratory (PNNL). Smith is also director of the NIH Proteomics Research Resource for Integrative Biology, an adjunct faculty member in the chemistry departments at Washington State University and the University of Utah, and an affiliate faculty member at the University of Idaho and the Department of Molecular Microbiology & Immunology, Oregon Health & Science University. He is the author or co-author of approximately 1100 peer-reviewed publications and has been awarded 70 US patents.

== Education ==
Smith obtained his B.S. in chemistry in 1971 from Lowell Technological Institute (currently the University of Massachusetts Lowell). He then received his PhD in the field of Physical Chemistry from the University of Utah in 1975.

== Early career ==
Starting in the 1970s Smith published peer-reviewed papers on several subjects, including mass spectrometry, ion cyclotron resonance mass spectrometry, ion-molecule reactions, molecular assemblies, and supercritical fluid solutions. This early work has led him to be considered an internationally recognized expert in mass spectrometry and separation techniques, and his research has led to advancements in instrumentation for the medical and environmental analysis fields, as well as biological research.

In the medical field, Smith's work has produced benefits in the areas of drug testing, analysis of pharmaceuticals and medical diagnostics in the clinical arena. His most successful invention has been the combination of capillary electro-phoresis with mass spectrometry. By the end of the 1990s, Smith's achievements included the electrodynamic ion funnel and a micro-dialysis device for the rapid purification of samples analyzed using mass spectrometry. Other notable contributions have been in the fields of supercritical fluids and related reverse micelle phenomena.

On August 22, 2000, Smith demonstrated and patented the electrodynamic ion funnel for highly efficient capture and focusing of ions in gases. He applied it for increasing the sensitivity of ESI-MS. His group has continued to refine and extend ion funnel technology, which is now widely applied in mass spectrometry and ion mobility instrumentation.

In the late 1990s, Smith's group was also extensively involved in the development and application of Fourier transform ion cyclotron resonance (FTICR) mass spectrometry, which provided the basis for much greater MS resolution and mass measurement accuracy, and particularly in the development of these technologies for applications in proteomics. More recent work has centered on extending application of these proteomics technologies to mammalian systems, which pose additional challenges due to their much greater complexity. One early focus has been the human blood plasma proteome due to its broad biomedical applications. Plasma proteome measurements potentially can provide the basis for discovery of protein biomarkers or signatures for virtually every disease state.

In September 1999, R&D Magazine picked the top 40 technologies of all time based on their impact on society, industry and commercial applications. The Top 40 were selected from a list of 3,600 past R&D 100 Awards. Smith was the recipient of one of these awards, for the development of capillary electrophoresis-mass spectrometry.

== Current research ==
Since the Human Genome Project developed a blueprint of all human genes in our chromosomes, proteomics researchers have pushed to understand how that blueprint creates life. Diseases and infections are often the result of proteins going wrong, and finding the aberrant one requires sifting through thousands of other proteins. In addition, many problem proteins have not been given names yet or are too rare to find easily.

In the last few years, Smith and his team have led work that has reduced analytical steps from hours to minutes. This increased speed has enabled many samples to be processed faster in high-throughput experiments. Smith has led other advances in sensitivity and accuracy that have improved the ability to find rare proteins, bringing proteomics technology to the doorstep of clinical researchers.

Smith and collaborators have applied the technology to liver disease and cancer in the hopes of finding rare markers of disease in blood, making diagnosis or treatment safer and faster. In 2007, Scientific American magazine listed Smith and his collaborator Desmond Smith as one of the top 50 researchers for work to understand the origins of Parkinson's disease by mapping where proteins amass in diseased mouse brains.

Among other work, Smith and colleagues at PNNL looked at how bacteria and viruses might cause illness. They've learned breast cancer leaves traces in the blood that doctors might research on someday. Smith led early studies for DOE into possible roles for microbes in making biofuels. In other DOE studies, he's examined how large environmental communities of microbes function in our ecosystem and affect our environment.

In other recent work he has been leading the development of structures for lossless ion manipulations (SLIM) and their application for very high speed sample processing, reactions, separations, and other manipulations of ions in the gas phase, and particularly their use for ion mobility spectrometry (IMS) separations in conjunction with mass spectrometry. Smith and colleagues at PNNL, including Drs. Yehia Ibrahim and Sandilya Gerimella, have extended the range of SLIM technologies to include the use of travel wave electric fields for SLIM IMS. This has enabled extremely high resolution separations based on 'multi-pass" separations, and has enabled the separation of ions previously impractical, such as isotopomers and isotopologues.

== Awards and affiliations ==
Smith a principal investigator at NIH Biomedical Technology Resource Center for Integrative Biology and the U.S. Department of Energy High Throughput Proteomics Facility at PNNL. He is an adjunct faculty member in the chemistry departments at Washington State University and the University of Utah and an affiliate faculty member Department of Chemistry at the University of Idaho and the Department of Molecular Microbiology & Immunology, Oregon Health & Science University. Smith serves on the Board of Scientific Counselors, Office of Public Health Preparedness and Response of the Centers for Disease Control and Prevention. He is also a Fellow of the American Association for the Advancement of Science, and has been elected to the Washington State Academy of Sciences.

In 2011, Discover Magazine selected a peer-reviewed paper on Lyme disease that he coauthored with immunologist Steven Schutzer of the University of Medicine and Dentistry of New Jersey as one of the top 100 articles of the year, placing it at number 90. He was the recipient of the 2003 ACS award in Analytical Chemistry, the 2009 Human Proteome Organization (HUPO) Discovery Award in Proteomics Sciences, and was selected by R&D Magazine as the 2010 R&D Scientist of the Year. He has also received ten R&D 100 Awards: Combined Orthogonal Mobility & Mass Evaluation Technology (2013); Ion Mobility Spectrometer on a Microchip (2010); Ultrasensitive Electrospray Ionization Mass Spectrometry Source and Interface (2009); FT-MS Proteome Express (2003); Electrodynamic Ion Funnel (1999); Rapid Microdialyzer (1998); MICLEAN/MICARE Process (1998); Rapid Expansion of Supercritical Fluid Solutions Process (1988); Capillary Electrophoresis-Electrospray Ionization-MS (1988); and Supercritical Fluid Chromatography-MS (1983). He was the recipient of the 2013 Award for a Distinguished Contribution in Mass Spectrometry.
