= ST-124-M3 inertial platform =

Saturn V component

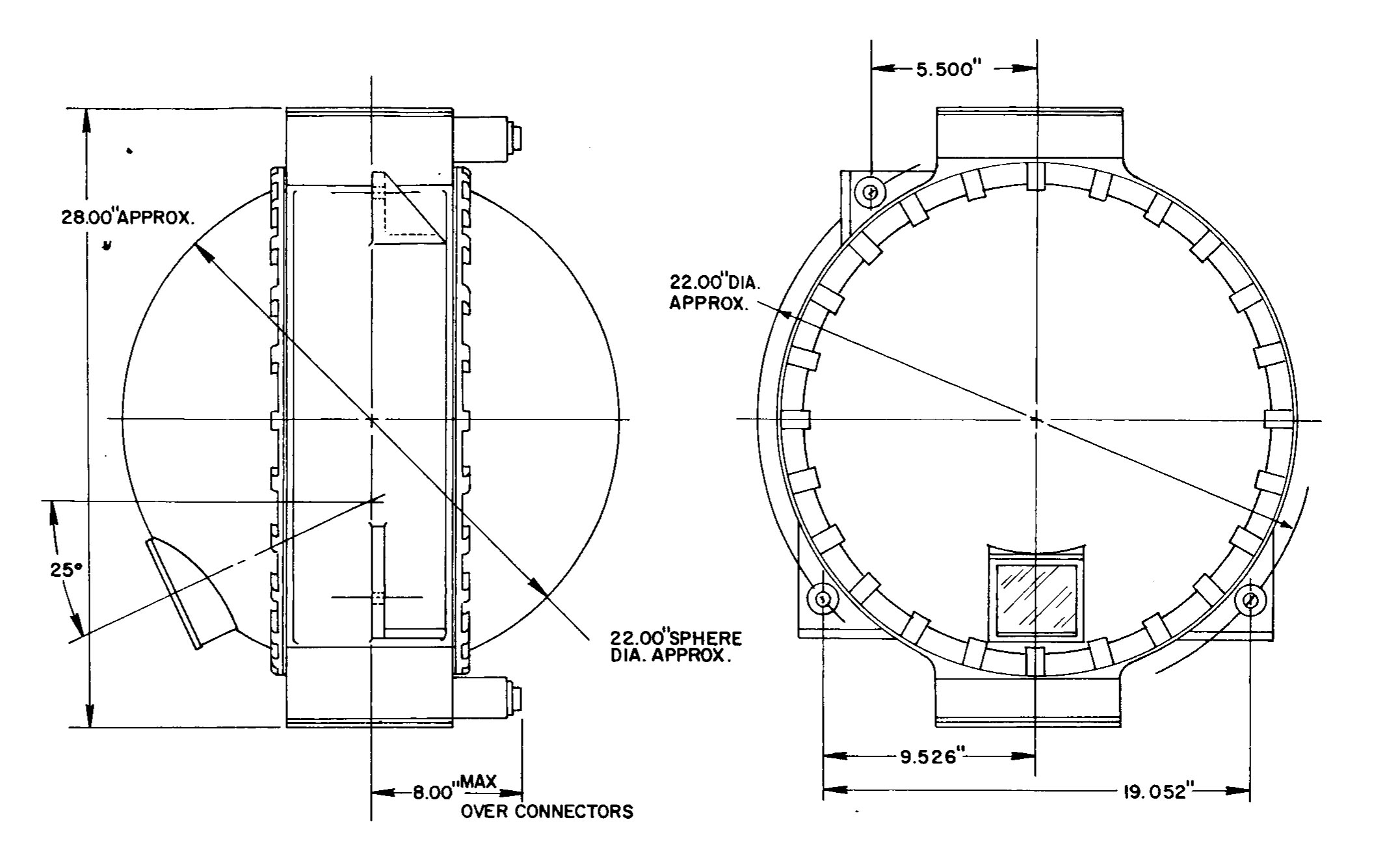
Drawing of ST-124M Inertial Platform.

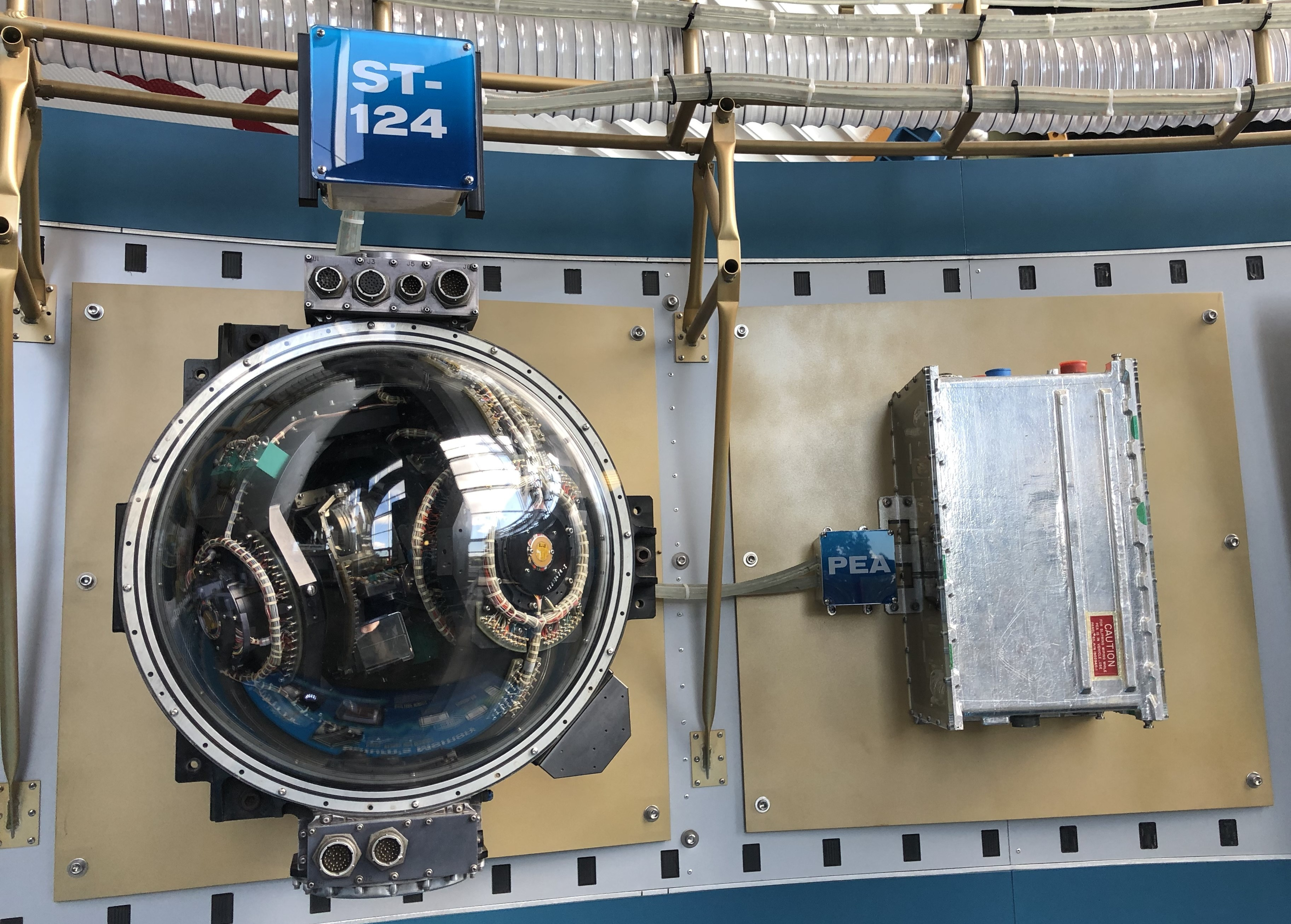
Apollo Saturn V ST-124 Gyro on display at Huntsville AL Space museum

The ST-124-M3 inertial platform was a device for measuring acceleration and attitude of the Saturn V launch vehicle. It was carried by the Saturn V Instrument Unit, a 3-foot-high (0.91 m), 22-foot-diameter (6.7 m) section of the Saturn V that fit between the third stage (S-IVB) and the Apollo spacecraft. Its nomenclature means "stable table" (ST) for use in the Moon mission (M), and it has 3 gimbals.

== Development ==
It was number 124 in a series of similar devices, including the ST-80 (used in the Redstone), the ST-90 (used on the Jupiter and on early Saturn I flights), and the ST-120 (used in the Pershing missile). They are descendants of the Siemens Vertikant LEV-3 guidance system of the German V-2 rocket. The ST-124 was designed by Marshall Space Flight Center and manufactured by Bendix Corporation, Eclipse-Pioneer Division, in Teterboro, New Jersey. It took 9 men 22 to 24 weeks to assemble an ST-124, and 70 percent of that time was spent installing about 3,000 wires. Frank Cornella delivered the instruments (Gyros and accelerometers) from Teterboro, New Jersey to Marshall Space Flight Center in Huntsville, Alabama.

== Mission history ==
The ST-124 stabilized platform was part of the guidance, navigation, and control system of the Saturn V. Data from the ST-124 were used by the Launch Vehicle Digital Computer (another Instrument Unit component) to compare actual flight data to programmed flight plans and to calculate guidance corrections. Though the ST-124 operated all during the mission, its data were not used for guidance while the vehicle was in the atmosphere, where it was subjected to high drag forces. In this region, basically the time of the first stage burn, the vehicle followed a simple preprogrammed flight plan.

== Internal details ==
The attitude of the vehicle was measured relative to a coordinate system that was fixed just prior to launch with the X coordinate vertical, the Z coordinate in the direction of the pitch maneuver (down range, roughly East), and the Y coordinate perpendicular to the other two, cross range, roughly North to South. At the heart of the ST-124 was a platform that was held in a fixed orientation; hence the name "stabilized platform". It was connected by three gimbals that allowed the vehicle to roll, pitch and yaw but the stable platform was held fixed in space while the vehicle translated along its course.

The platform was stabilized by three gyros mounted on it. One measured any rotations about the X axis, one about the Y, and one about the Z axis. They generated signals that were shaped in feedback circuits and sent back to torquers on the inner, middle and outer gimbals that exactly countered the rotations, nulling the gyro outputs and keeping the platform stable.

The inner gimbal also carried three accelerometers, two pendulums, and a pair of prisms. The accelerometers measured vehicle acceleration along the X, Y, and Z axes. Their outputs were used by the LVDC to measure actual vehicle motion, for the purpose of navigation. The pendulums were used to set the X axis exactly vertical before launch, and the prisms were used to align the Y and Z axes, just before launch. The prisms reflected infrared beams sent into the ST-124 by a theodolite stationed on the ground 700 feet away from the launch pad. Commands from the theodolite were transmitted via cables inside the vehicle, to torquers in the ST-124 to orient the stable platform toward the correct azimuth.

The gyros, accelerometers and pendulums contained almost frictionless nitrogen gas bearings. These required very precise machining and very small gaps between the bearing surfaces. Dimensions were held to tolerances of 20 microinches (0.5 μm), and the gap filled by the nitrogen was about 600–800 microinches (15–20 μm). Nitrogen entered the gyros at about 15 psi and was vented to space via a pressure regulator in the bottom of the ST-124 that opened at 13 psi. The large silver sphere to the left of the ST-124 held the supply of nitrogen for the bearings.

The ST-124 included many components made of anodized beryllium. This material was chosen for its stiffness, light weight, machinability and stability. The case of the ST-124 was a short cylinder, 7.5 in (19 cm) high and 21 in (53 cm) in diameter, made of beryllium. The ends of the cylinder were closed by two approximately hemispherical aluminum covers. The gimbals and several parts of the gyros and accelerometers were also made of beryllium.

In contrast to beryllium, which is lightweight, the rotors of the gyros were made of Elkonite, a very dense, strong alloy. This is a sintered form of copper–tungsten, W90/Cu10, to make it machinable.

Heat generated by torquers and other electrical equipment inside the ST-124 was carried away by cooling coils built into the aluminum covers. A mixture of methanol and water at 15 °C (59 °F) was circulated through the coils. The internal temperature of the ST-124 stabilized at about 42 °C (108 °F).

== Gallery ==
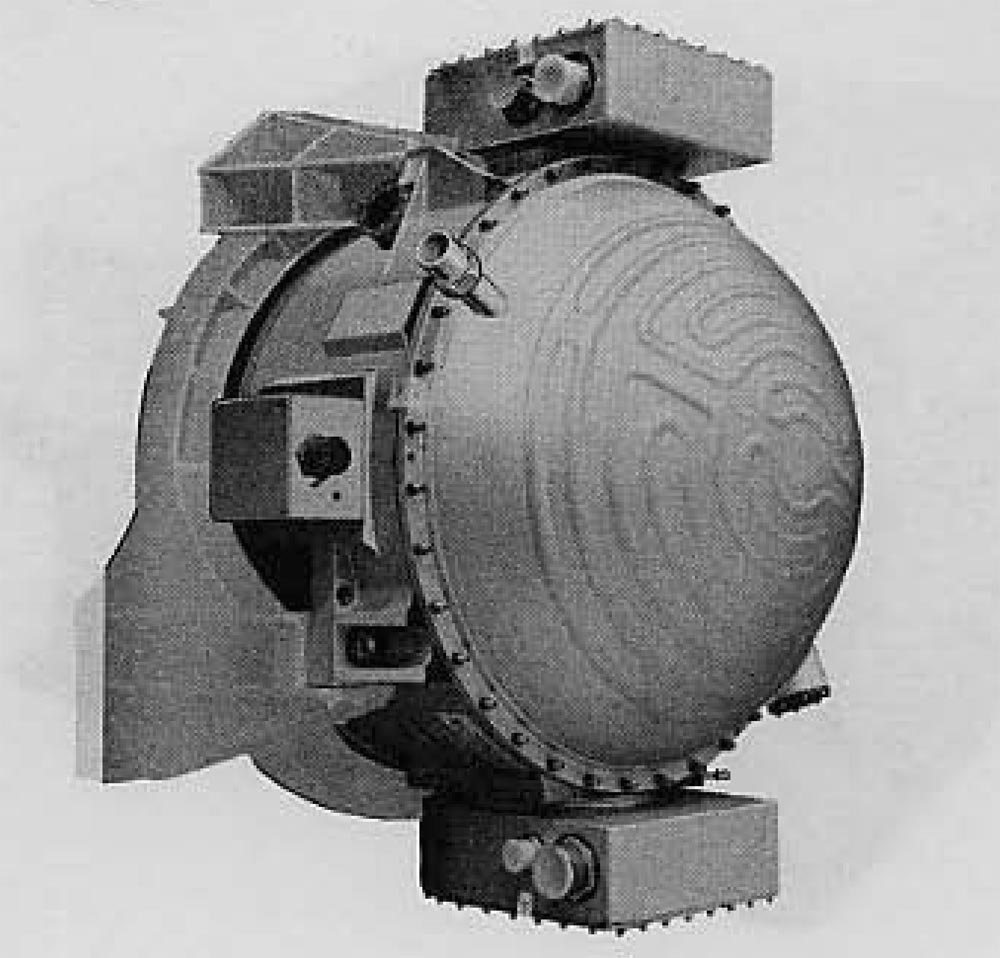
Figure of ST-124M from Instrument Unit technical manual

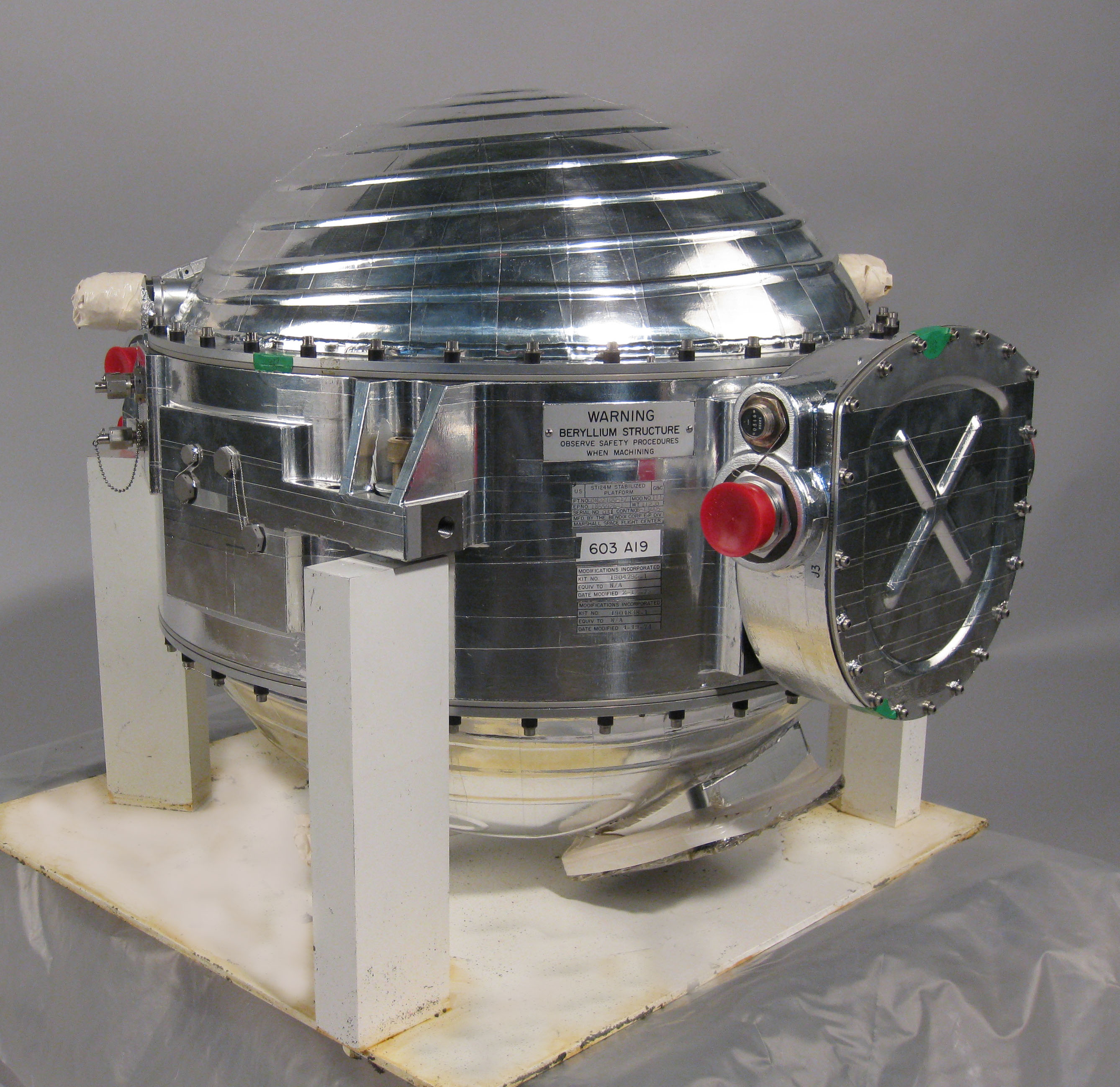
Late model ST-124 in the collection of National Air and Space Museum, Washington, DC

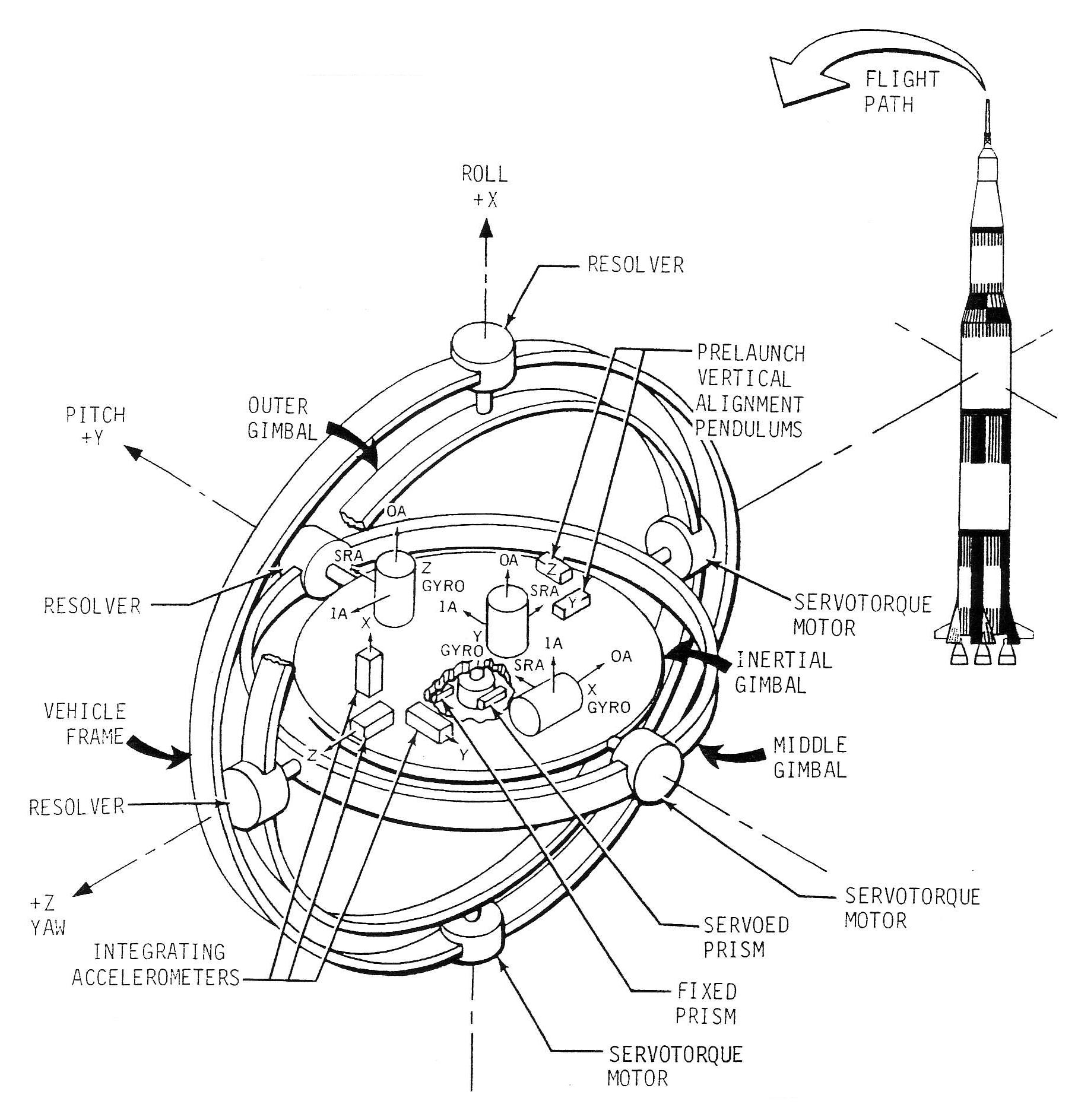
Diagram of ST-124 gimbals

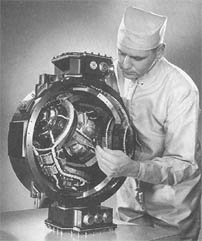
ST-124 and technician

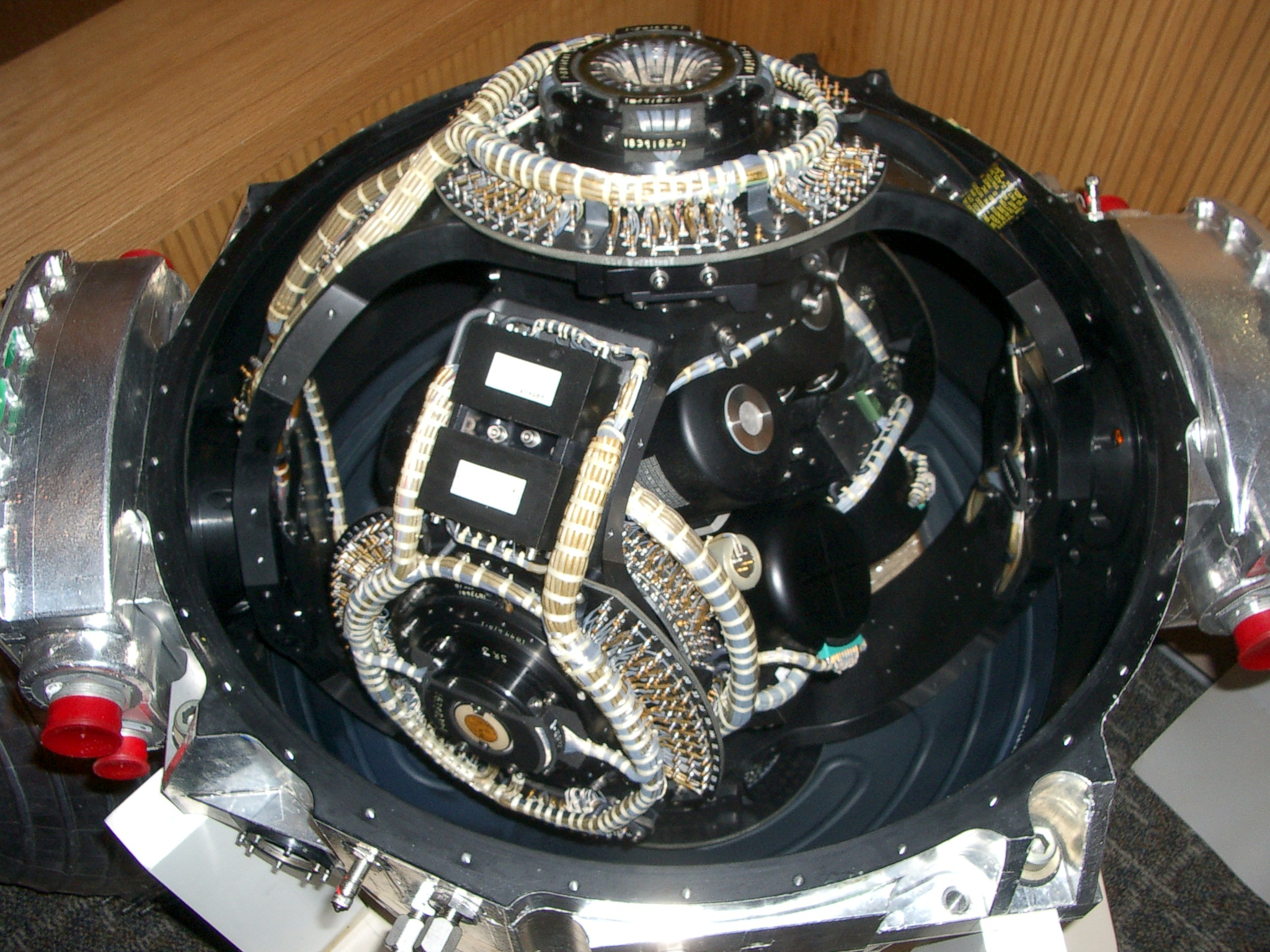
ST-124 on display at Honeywell Defense Avionics Systems in Teterboro, NJ

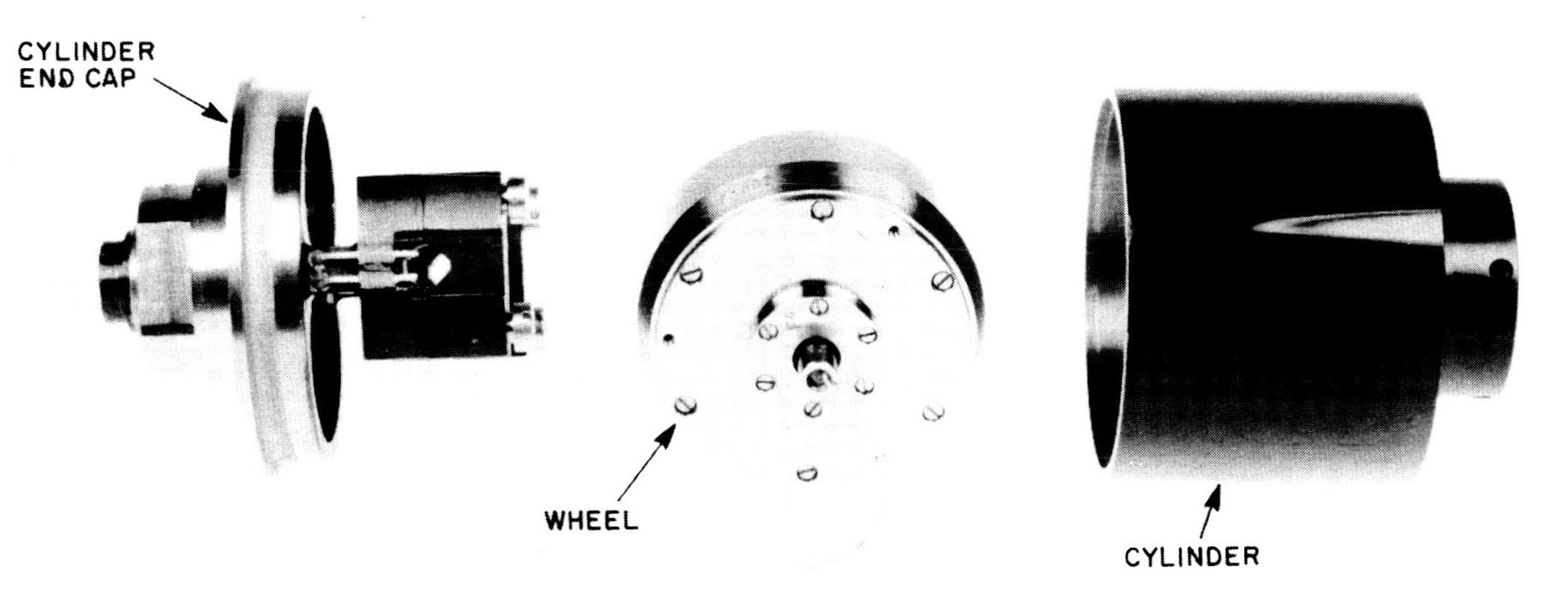
AB5-K8 gyro inner cylinder assembly

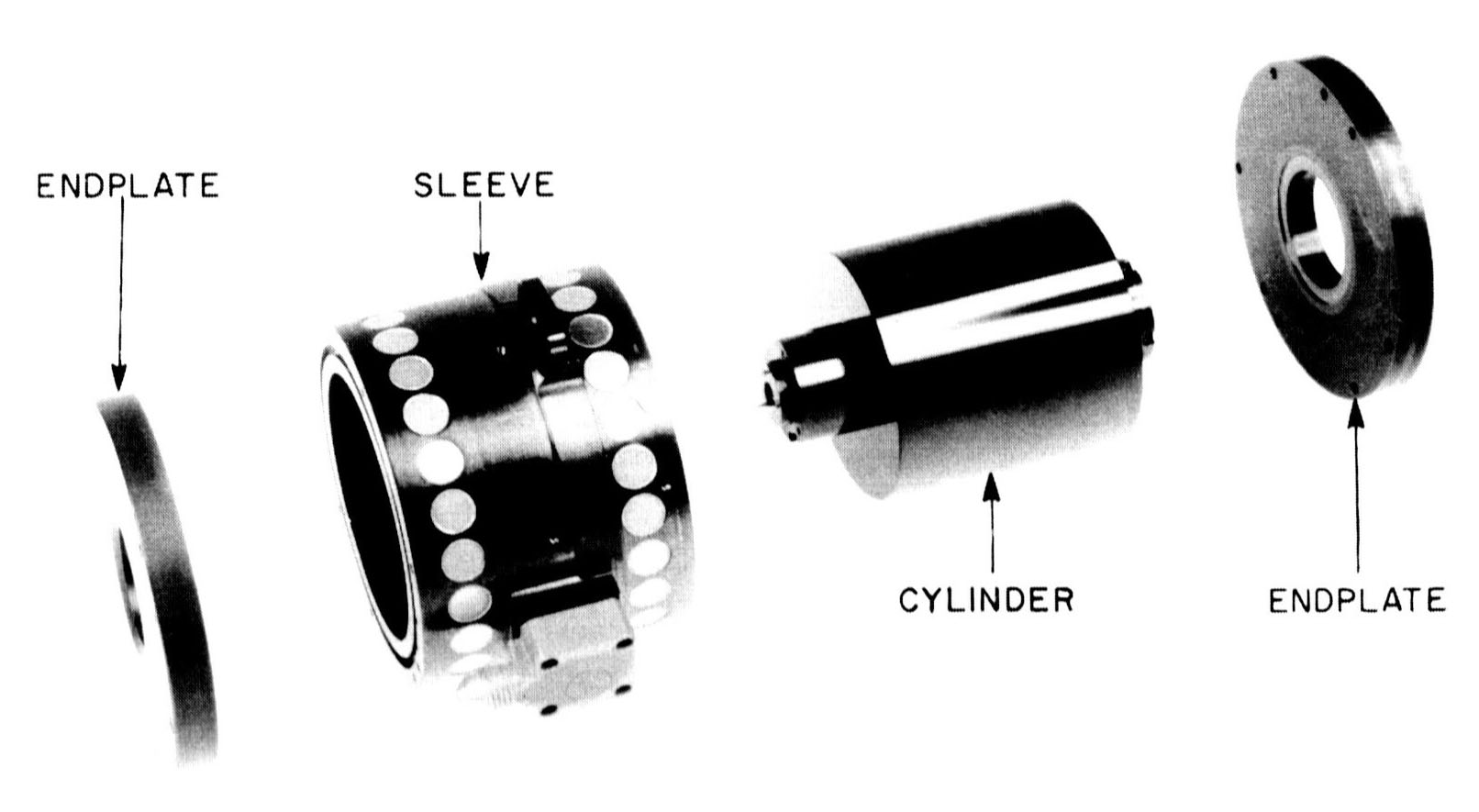
AB5-K8 gyro gas bearing assembly

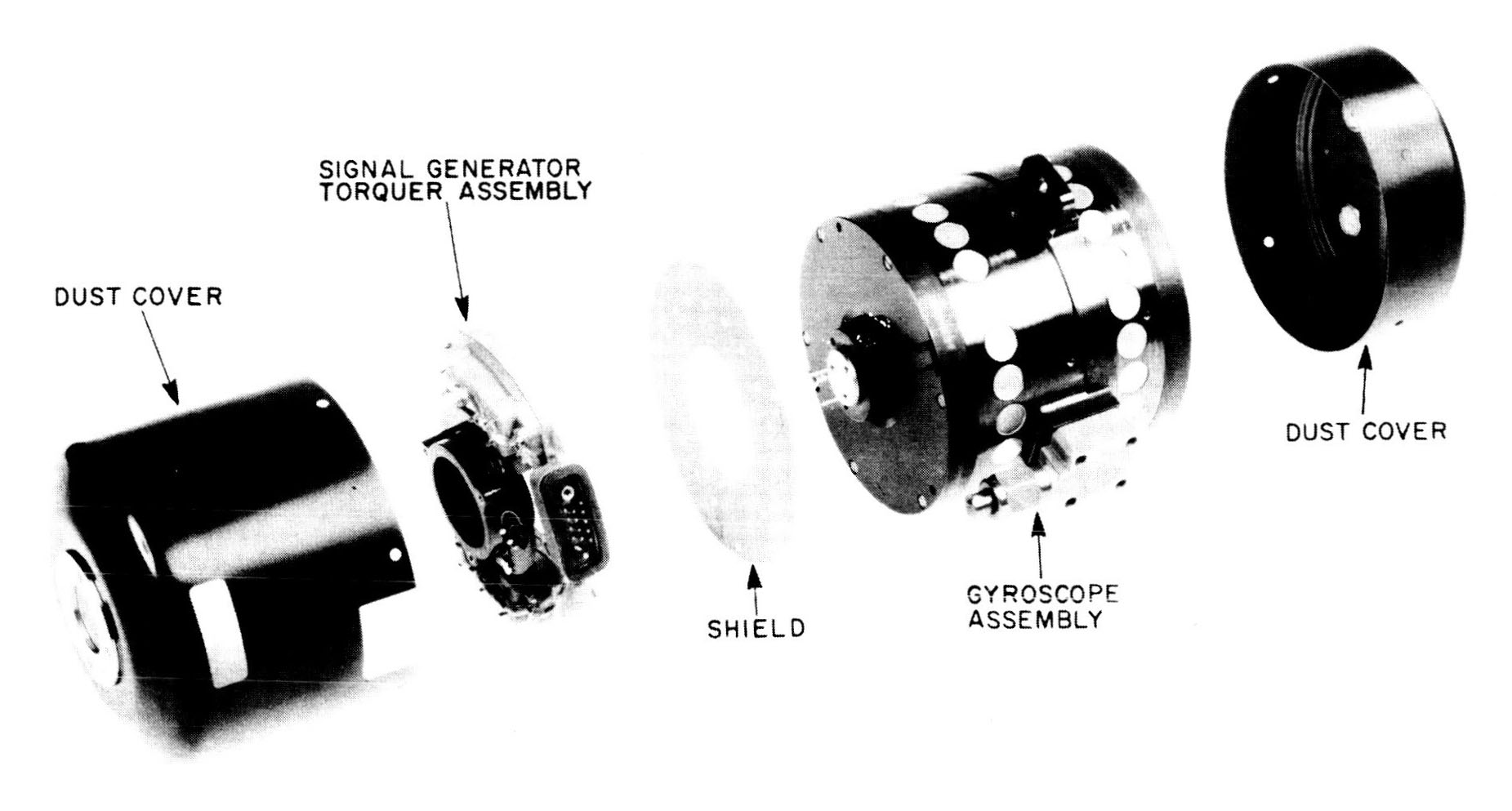
AB5-K8 gyro

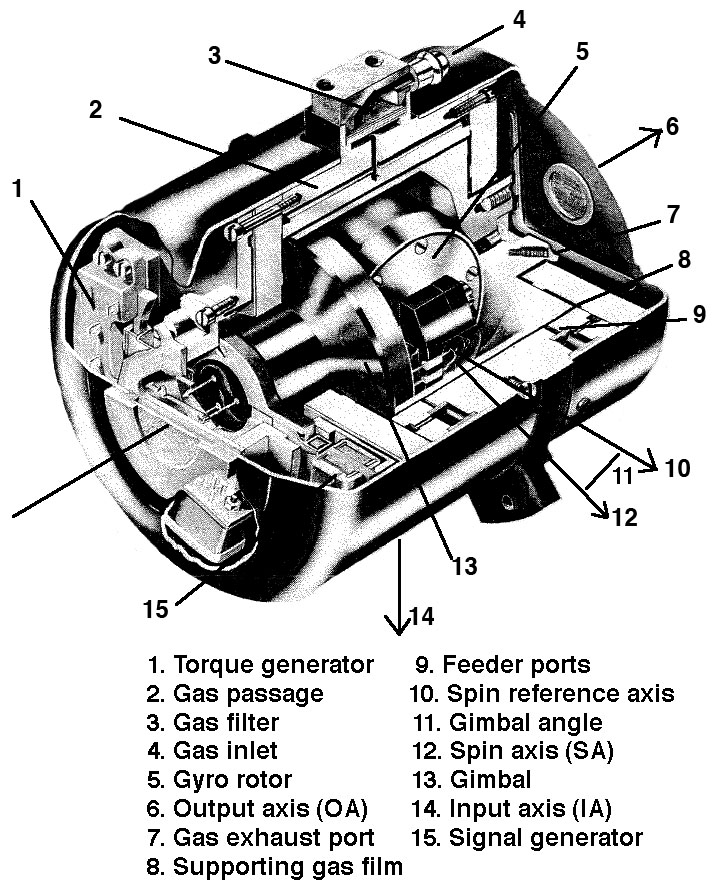
Cutaway drawing of the AB5-K8 gyro

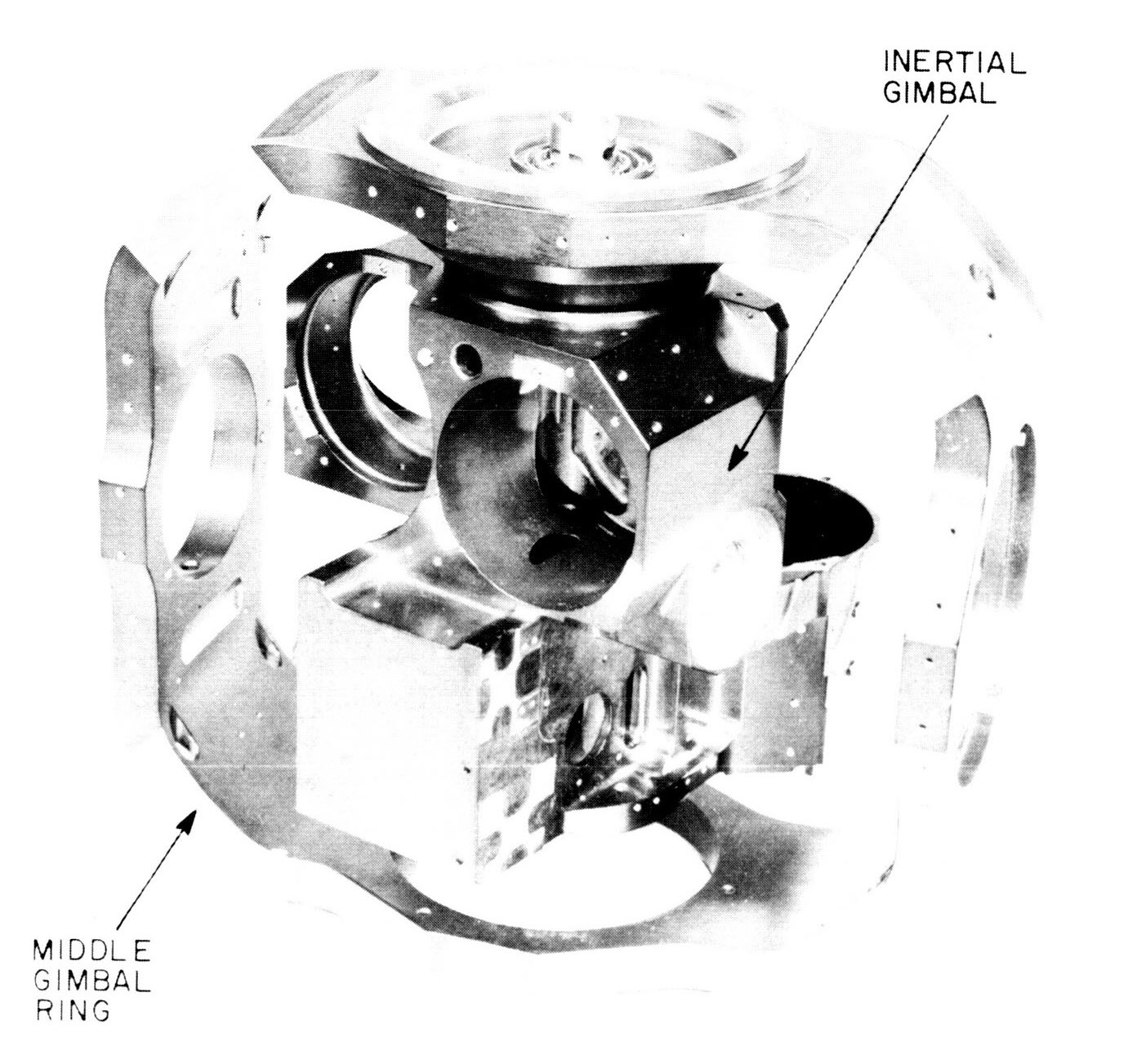
Inner and middle gimbals

== Bibliography ==
- Bilstein, Roger E. (1980). "8: From Checkout to Launch: The Quintessential Computer". Stages to Saturn: A Technological History of the Apollo/Saturn Launch Vehicles. NASA History Series. NASA. pp. 243–253. hdl:2060/19970009949. ISBN 0-16-048909-1. NASA SP-4206; 97N-15592.
- Haeussermann, Walter (July 1970). Description and Performance of the Saturn Launch Vehicle's Navigation, Guidance, and Control System (Report). NASA. hdl:2060/19700023342. NASA TN-D-5869; 70N-32653.
- Thomason, Herman E. (September 1965). General Description of the ST-124M Inertial Platform System (Report). NASA. hdl:2060/19650024833. NASA TN-D-2983; 65N-34434. This has clearer figures than most of the PDF documents about the IU, providing the best views of the insides of the gyros and gas bearings.
