= Saturn V instrument unit =

Structure that contains the Saturn rocket guidance system

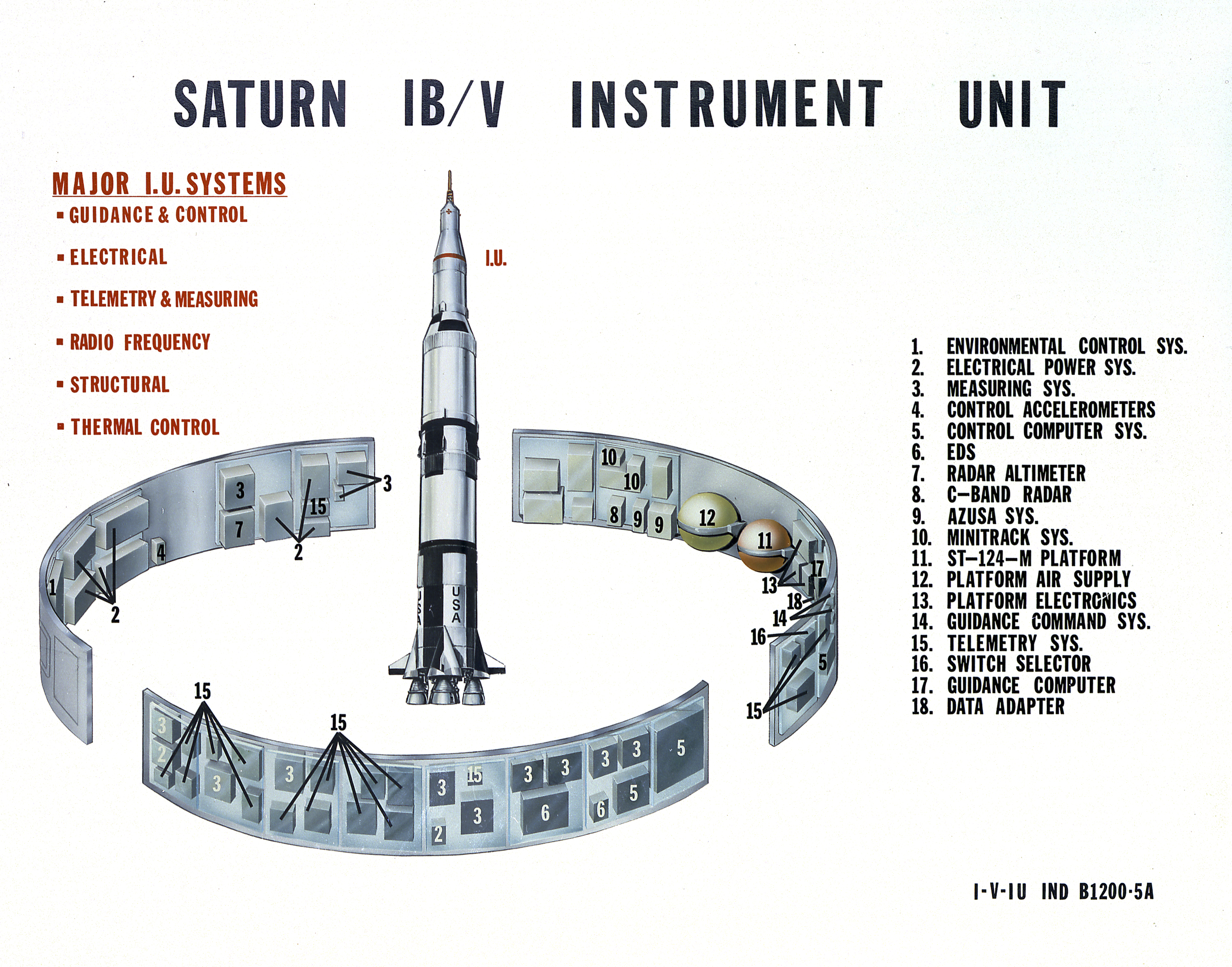
Diagram of Saturn V instrument unit

The Saturn V instrument unit (IU) is a ring-shaped structure fitted to the top of the Saturn V rocket's third stage (S-IVB) and the Saturn IB's second stage (also an S-IVB). It was immediately below the SLA (Spacecraft/Lunar Module Adapter) panels that contained the Apollo Lunar Module. The instrument unit contains the guidance system for the Saturn V rocket. Some of the electronics contained within the instrument unit are a digital computer, analog flight control computer, emergency detection system, inertial guidance platform, control accelerometers, and control rate gyros. The instrument unit (IU) for Saturn V was designed by NASA at Marshall Space Flight Center (MSFC) and was developed from the Saturn I IU. NASA's contractor to manufacture the Saturn V Instrument Unit was International Business Machines (IBM).

One of the unused instrument units is on display at the Steven F. Udvar-Hazy Center in Chantilly, Virginia. The plaque for the unit has the following inscription:

The Saturn V rocket, which sent astronauts to the Moon, used inertial guidance, a self-contained system that guided the rocket's trajectory. The rocket booster had a guidance system separate from those on the command and lunar modules. It was contained in an instrument unit like this one, a ring located between the rocket's third stage and the command and lunar modules. The ring contained the basic guidance system components—a stable platform, accelerometers, a digital computer, and control electronics—as well as radar, telemetry, and other units.

The instrument unit's stable platform was based on an experimental unit for the German V-2 rocket of World War II. The Bendix Corporation produced the platform, while IBM designed and built the unit's digital computer.

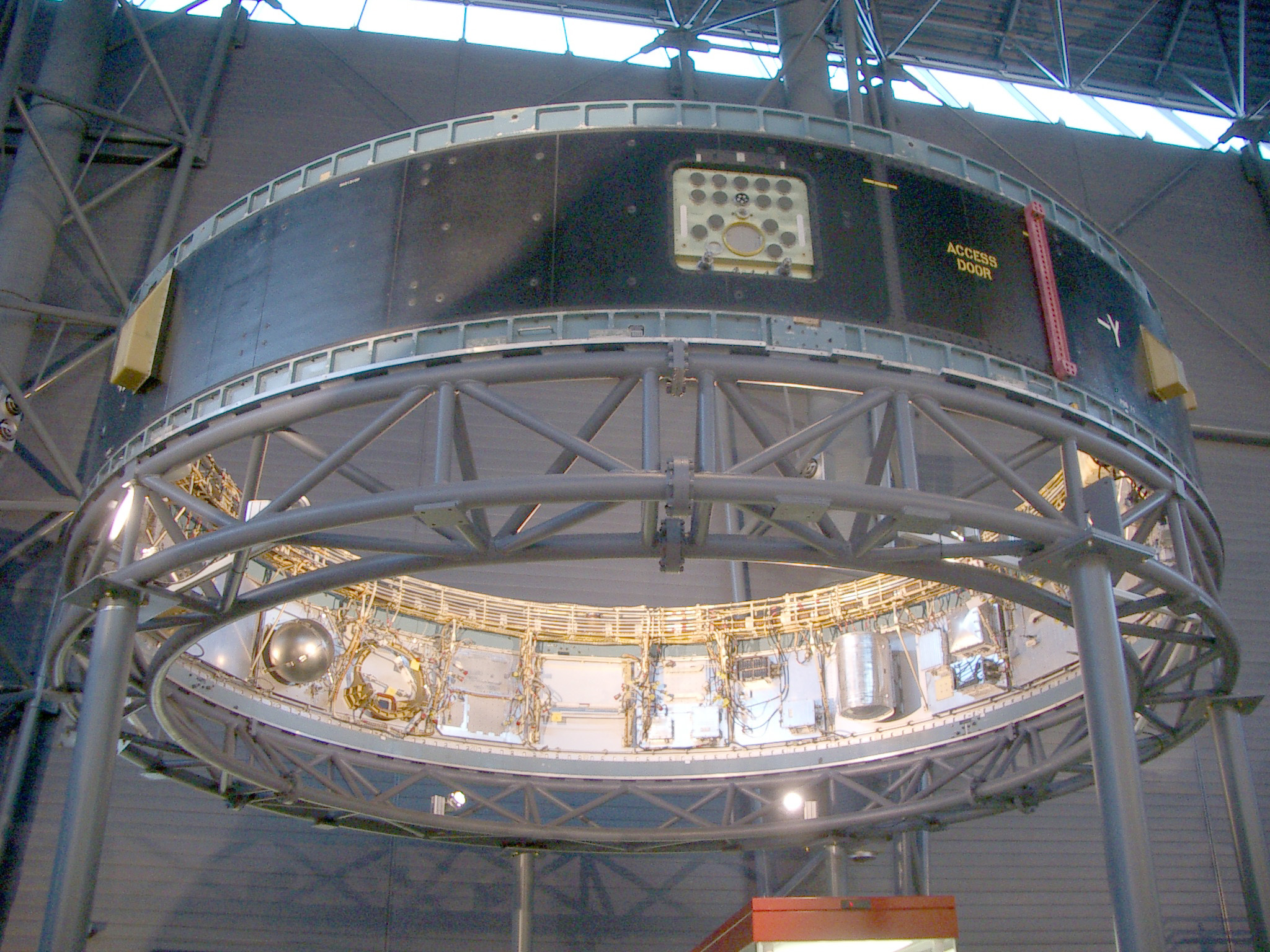
View of IU-514 from the floor of UHC

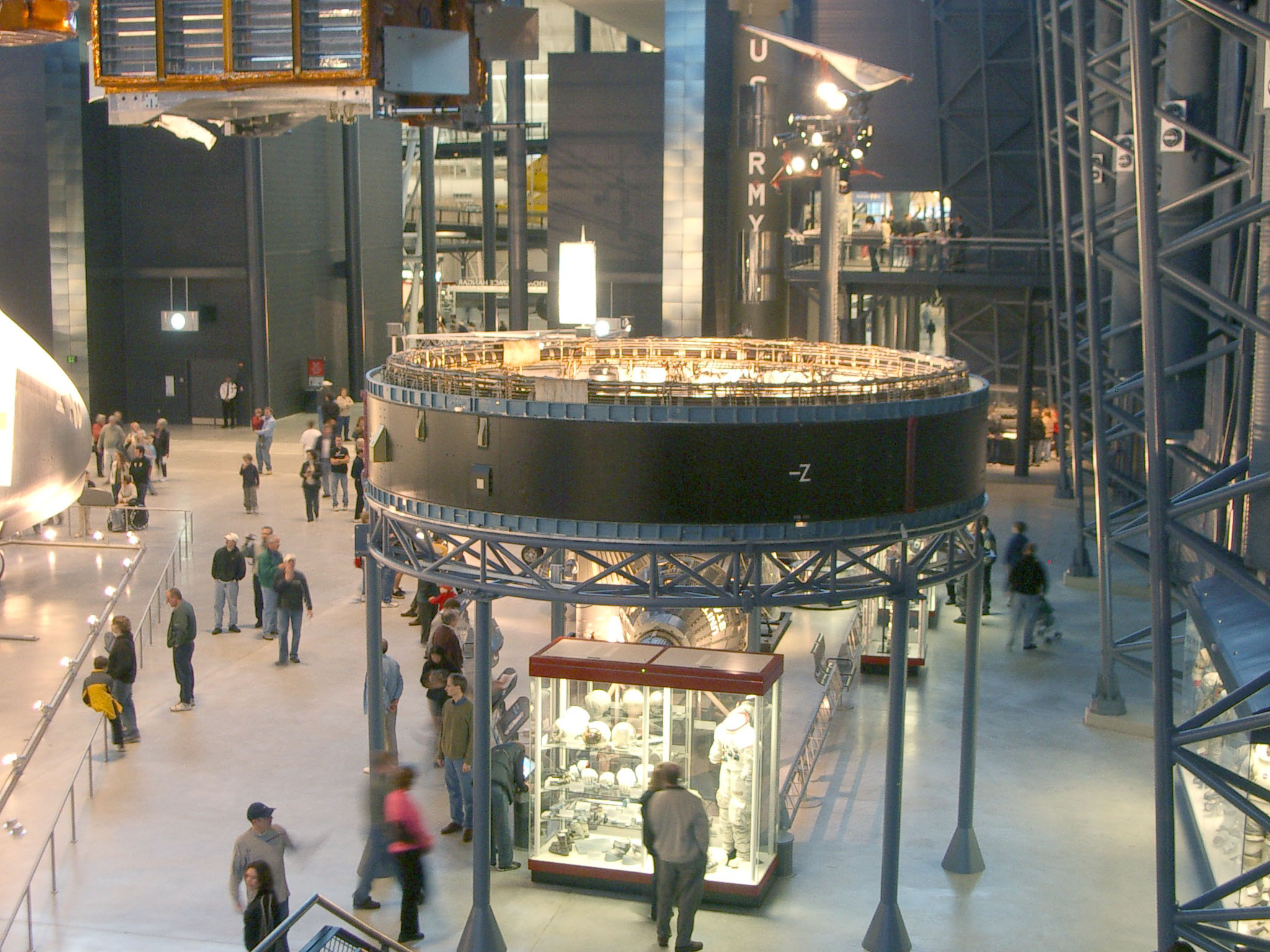
Instrument unit no. 514 at National Air & Space Museum, Udvar-Hazy Center, Dulles, Virginia; the nose of Space Shuttle Enterprise is visible at left.

== Specifications ==
- Diameter: 260 inches (6.6 m)
- Height: 36 inches (914 mm)
- Weight at launch: ~4,400 lb (1996 kg)

== Mission history ==
There was no instrument unit for Saturn I Block I boosters (SA-1 to SA-4). Guidance and control equipment was carried in canisters on top of the S-I first stage, and included the ST-90 stabilized platform, made by Ford Instrument Company and used in the Jupiter missile.

Digital Guidance Computer
Saturn Launch Vehicle	Launch Missions	Guidance Computer	Key Role/Notes
Saturn I	Block I (SA-1 to SA-4)	None (analog/mechanical)	A magnetic tape device and a cam device handled control and guidance (a non-inertial, non-digital system).
Saturn I	Block II (SA-5 to SA-10)	ASC-15 by IBM	Onboard SA-5 as a test. Became the digital guidance computer for the upper stage on SA-6 and both stages on subsequent flights.
Saturn IB	AS-201 to ASTP	Launch Vehicle Digital Computer by IBM	The digital guidance computer, located in the IU and used on both the Saturn IB and the Saturn V. It controlled steering, engine ignition, and staging operations.
Saturn V	Apollo 4 to Skylab 1	Launch Vehicle Digital Computer by IBM	The same computer system of the Saturn IB also served as the autopilot for the Saturn V, guiding it from launch through Earth orbit insertion and Trans-Lunar Injection.

Analog Flight Computer/Control Device
Saturn Launch Vehicle	Launch Missions		Analog Computer or Device		Function
Saturn I	Block I (SA-1 to SA-4)		Canister-15	Cam Device	Provided a pitch-program/tilt-schedule.
Saturn I	Block I (SA-1 to SA-4)		Canister-15	Tape Recorder	A 6-track tape device that scheduled a precise time-dependent sequence of events (e.g., staging, cutoff).
Saturn I	Block II	(SA-5 to SA-7)	Four containers and a central hub		Thrust Vector Control (TVC) and Three-axis attitude stabilization.
Saturn I	Block II	(SA-8 to SA-10)	Components mounted on the wall of the IU ring		Thrust Vector Control (TVC) and Three-axis attitude stabilization.
Saturn IB & Saturn V	All Flights		Flight Control Computer by ECI		Analog computer for processing TVC commands or calculating "Control Law" for vehicle stabilization, then outputting control signals to the engine actuator system (gimbals/steering).

The IU made its debut with SA-5, the first Saturn I Block II launch. The first version of the IU was 154 inches (3.9 m) in diameter and 58 inches (1.5 m) high, and was both designed and built by MSFC. Guidance, telemetry, tracking and power components were contained in four pressurized, cylindrical containers attached like spokes to a central hub.

MSFC flew version 2 of the IU on SA-8, 9 and 10. Version 2 was the same diameter as version 1, but only 34 inches (0.86 m) high. Instead of pressurized containers, the components were hung on the inside of the cylindrical wall, achieving a reduction in weight.

The last version, number 3, was 260 inches (6.6 m) in diameter and 36 inches (0.91 m) tall. It was designed by MSFC but manufactured by IBM in their factory at Huntsville, and flew on all Saturn IB and Saturn V launches. This is the version that is on display in Washington, Huntsville, Houston, and the Apollo/Saturn V Center.

Saturn instrument unit launch history
Program	Vehicle	Mission	Launch date	Pad	IU version	IU
Saturn I	SA-1	SA-1	27 Oct 1961	34	-	
Saturn I	SA-2	SA-2	25 Apr 1962	34	-	
Saturn I	SA-3	SA-3	16 Nov 1962	34	-	
Saturn I	SA-4	SA-4	28 Mar 1963	34	-	
Saturn I	SA-5	SA-5	29 Jan 1964	37B	1	S-IU-5
Saturn I	SA-6	AS-101	28 May 1964	37B	1	S-IU-6
Saturn I	SA-7	AS-102	18 Sep 1964	37B	1	S-IU-7
Saturn I	SA-9	AS-103	16 Feb 1965	37B	2	S-IU-9
Saturn I	SA-8	AS-104	25 May 1965	37B	2	S-IU-8
Saturn I	SA-10	AS-105	30 Jul 1965	37B	2	S-IU-10
Saturn IB	SA-201	AS-201	26 Feb 1966	34	3	S-IU-201
Saturn IB	SA-203	AS-203	5 Jul 1966	37B	3	S-IU-203
Saturn IB	SA-202	AS-202	25 Aug 1966	34	3	S-IU-202
Saturn V	SA-501	Apollo 4	9 Nov 1967	39A	3	S-IU-501
Saturn IB	SA-204	Apollo 5	22 Jan 1968	37B	3	S-IU-204
Saturn V	SA-502	Apollo 6	4 Apr 1968	39A	3	S-IU-502
Saturn IB	SA-205	Apollo 7	11 Oct 1968	34	3	S-IU-205
Saturn V	SA-503	Apollo 8	21 Dec 1968	39A	3	S-IU-503
Saturn V	SA-504	Apollo 9	3 Mar 1969	39A	3	S-IU-504
Saturn V	SA-505	Apollo 10	18 May 1969	39B	3	S-IU-505
Saturn V	SA-506	Apollo 11	16 Jul 1969	39A	3	S-IU-506
Saturn V	SA-507	Apollo 12	14 Nov 1969	39A	3	S-IU-507
Saturn V	SA-508	Apollo 13	11 Apr 1970	39A	3	S-IU-508
Saturn V	SA-509	Apollo 14	31 Jan 1971	39A	3	S-IU-509
Saturn V	SA-510	Apollo 15	26 Jul 1971	39A	3	S-IU-510
Saturn V	SA-511	Apollo 16	16 Apr 1972	39A	3	S-IU-511
Saturn V	SA-512	Apollo 17	7 Dec 1972	39A	3	S-IU-512
Saturn V	SA-513	Skylab 1	14 May 1973	39A	3	S-IU-513
Saturn IB	SA-206	Skylab 2	25 May 1973	39B	3	S-IU-206
Saturn IB	SA-207	Skylab 3	28 Jul 1973	39B	3	S-IU-207
Saturn IB	SA-208	Skylab 4	16 Nov 1973	39B	3	S-IU-208
Saturn IB	SA-210	ASTP	15 Jul 1975	39B	3	S-IU-210
Saturn IB	SA-209	Skylab Rescue	Unflown	—N/a	—N/a	S-IU-209
Saturn IB	SA-211	Unassigned	Unflown	—N/a	—N/a	S-IU-211
Saturn IB	SA-212	Unassigned	Unflown	—N/a	—N/a	S-IU-212
Saturn V	SA-514	Apollo 18	Unflown	—N/a	—N/a	S-IU-514
Saturn V	SA-515	Apollo 19	Unflown	—N/a	—N/a	S-IU-515
Saturn V	SA-500-F	Ground Test Vehicle	Unflown	—N/a	—N/a	S-IU-500F(200F)
Saturn V	SA-500-D	Ground Test Vehicle	Unflown	—N/a	—N/a	S-IU-D

== Mission profile ==
Saturn Apollo flight profiles varied considerably by mission. All missions began, however, with liftoff under power of the first stage. To more smoothly control engine ignition, thrust buildup and liftoff of the vehicle, restraining arms provided support and hold down at four points around the base of the S-IC stage. A gradual controlled release was accomplished during the first six inches of vertical motion.

After clearing the launch tower, a flight program stored in the launch vehicle digital computer (LVDC) commanded a roll of the vehicle to orient it so that the subsequent pitch maneuver pointed the vehicle in the desired azimuth. The roll and pitch commands were controlled by the stored program, and were not affected by navigation measurements. Until the end of the S-IC burn, guidance commands were functions only of time.

First stage cutoff and stage separation were commanded when the IU received a signal that the tank's fuel level had reached a predetermined point. Guidance during the second and third stage burns depended both on time and navigation measurements, in order to achieve the target orbit using the minimum fuel.

Second stage engine cutoff was commanded by the IU at a pre-determined fuel level, and the stage was separated. By this time, the vehicle had reached its approximate orbital altitude, and the third stage burn was just long enough to reach a circular parking orbit.

During crewed Apollo missions, the vehicle coasted in Earth orbit for 2-4 passes as the crew performed checks of systems status and other tasks, and as ground stations tracked the vehicle. During the hour and a half after launch, tracking stations around the world had refined estimates of the vehicle's position and velocity, collectively known as its state vector. The latest estimates were relayed to the guidance systems in the IU, and to the Command Module Computer in the spacecraft. When the Moon, Earth, and vehicle were in the optimum geometrical configuration, the third stage was reignited to put the vehicle into a translunar orbit. For Apollo 15, for example, this burn lasted 5 minutes 55 seconds.

After translunar injection came the maneuver called transposition, docking, and extraction. This was under crew control, but the IU held the S-IVB/IU vehicle steady while the Command/Service Module (CSM) first separated from the vehicle, rotated 180 degrees, and returned to dock with the Lunar Module (LM). When the CSM and LM had "hard docked" (connected by a dozen latches), the rearranged spacecraft separated from the S-IVB/IU.

The last function of the IU was to command the very small maneuver necessary to keep the S-IVB/IU out of the way of the spacecraft. On some missions the S-IVB/IU went into high Earth or Solar orbit, while on others it was crashed into the Moon; seismometers were left on the Moon during Apollo 11, 12, 14, 15, and 16, and the S-IVB/IUs of Apollo 13, 14, 15, 16, and 17 were directed to crash. These impacts provided impulses that were recorded by the seismometer network to yield information about the geological structure of the Moon.

== Subsystems ==
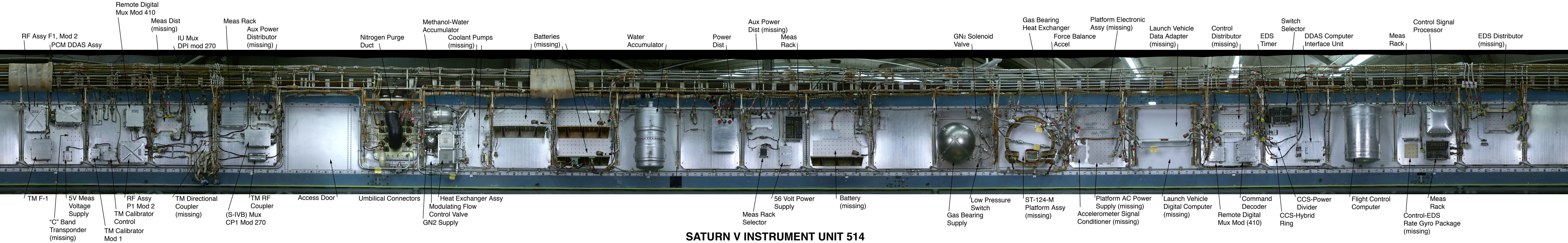
Interior of IU-514, with components labeled

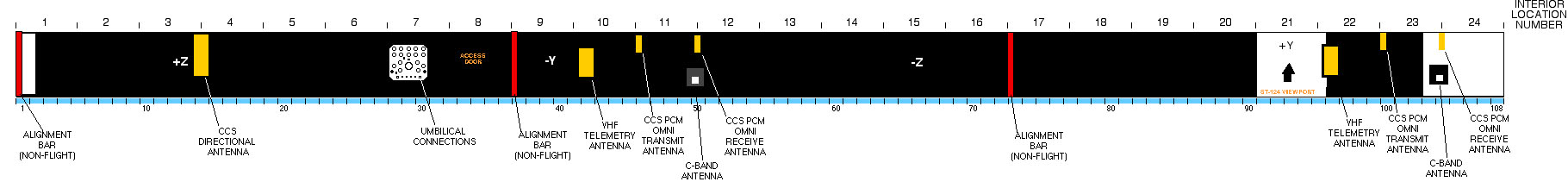
Diagram of exterior of IU-514

The IU consists of six subsystems: structure, guidance and control, environmental control, emergency detection, radio communications (for telemetry, tracking, and command), and power.

=== Structure ===
The basic IU structure is a short cylinder, 36 inches high and 260 inches (6,600 mm) in diameter, fabricated of an aluminum alloy honeycomb sandwich material 0.95 inches (24 mm) thick. The cylinder is manufactured in three 120-degree segments, which are joined by splice plates into an integral structure. The top and bottom edges are made from extruded aluminum channels bonded to the honeycomb sandwich. This type of construction was selected for its high strength to weight ratio, acoustical insulation, and thermal conductivity properties. The IU supported the components mounted on its inner wall and the weight of the Apollo spacecraft above (the Lunar Module, the Command Module, the Service Module, and the Launch Escape Tower). To facilitate handling the IU before it was assembled into the Saturn, the fore and aft protective rings, 6 inches tall and painted blue, were bolted to the top and bottom channels. These were removed in the course of stacking the IU into the Saturn vehicle. The structure was manufactured by North American Rockwell in Tulsa, Oklahoma. Edward A. Beasley was the I.U. Program Manager.

The IU is divided into 24 locations, which are marked on the interior by numbers 1–24 on the aluminum surface just above the blue flange.

=== Guidance, navigation, and control ===
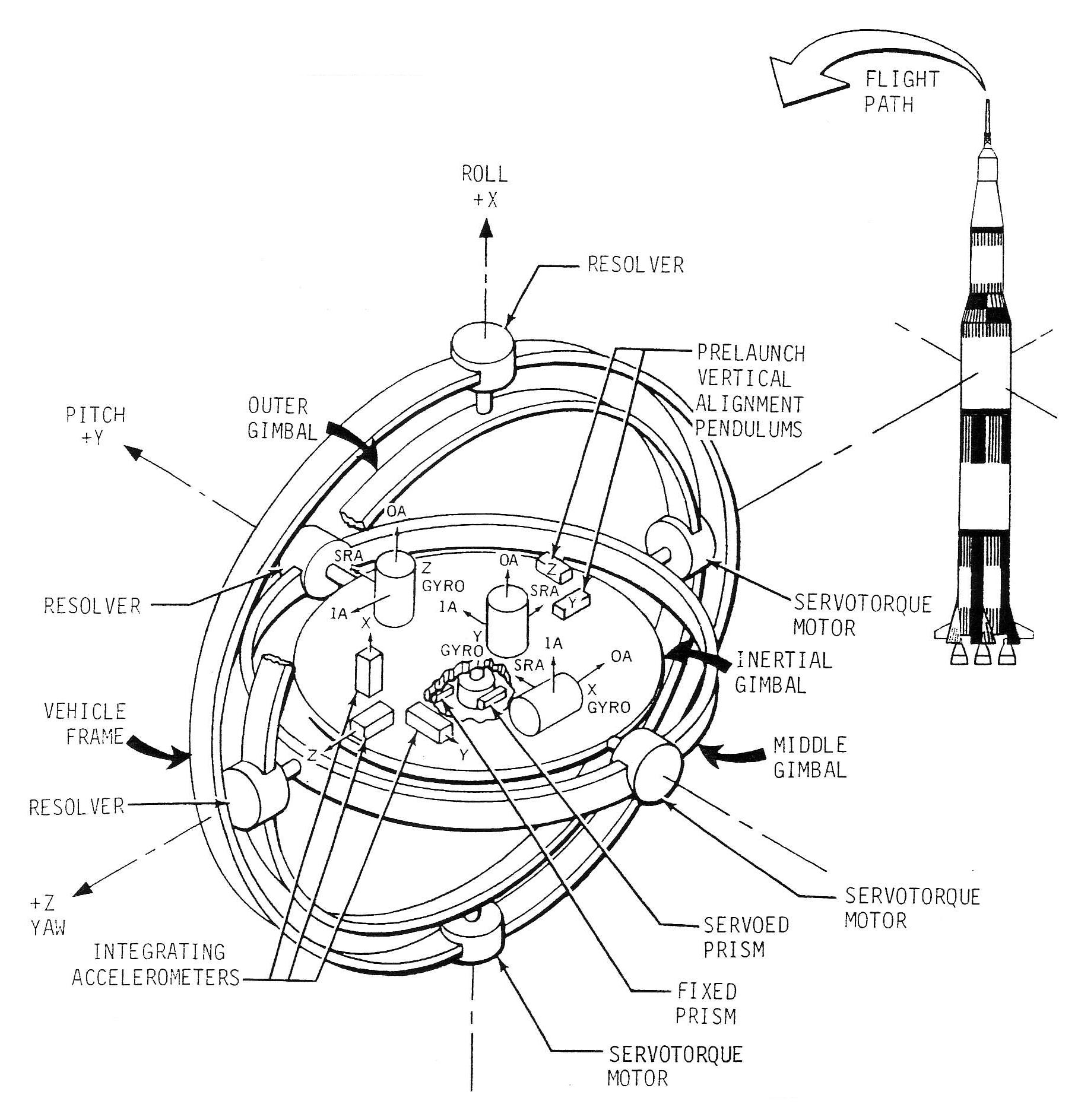
Drawing on the ST-124-M3 inertial platform

The Saturn V launch vehicle's GN&C architecture featured Guidance, Navigation, and Control equipment located in the IU. A space stabilized platform (the ST-124-M3 inertial platform at location 21) measured acceleration and attitude. A launch vehicle digital computer (LVDC at location 19) solved guidance equations, and an analog flight control computer (location 16) issued commands to steer the vehicle.

The attitude of the vehicle was defined in terms of three axes:

- The roll axis (X) runs from tail to nose and was vertical at time of launch.
- The pitch axis (Y) is at right angles to the roll axis, and is marked on the exterior of the IU by +Y above the viewport, outside location 21.
- The yaw axis (Z) is at right angles to both the pitch and roll axis, and is marked by +Z outside location 3.

The ST-124-M3 inertial platform contains three gimbals: the outer gimbal (which can rotate 360° about the roll or X axis of the vehicle), the middle gimbal (which can rotate ±45° about the yaw or Z axis of the vehicle), and the inner or inertial gimbal (which can rotate 360° about the pitch or Y axis of the vehicle). The inner gimbal is a platform to which are fixed several components:

- Two vertical alignment pendulums sent signals before launch to ground support equipment, which generated signals to the platform gyro torque generators to level the inner gimbal. The vertical alignment system levelled the platform to an accuracy of ±2.5 arc seconds.
- Two prisms, one fixed and one servo-driven, were used with an external theodolite which sighted through the viewport outside location 21 to set the azimuth of the inner gimbal before launch. The azimuth could be set to an accuracy of ±5 arc seconds.
- Three single-degree-of-freedom gyroscopes have their input axes aligned along an orthogonal inertial coordinate system. Three signal generators, fixed to the output axis of each gyro, generated electrical signals proportional to the torque disturbances. The signals were transmitted through the servo electronics which terminated in the gimbal pivot servotorque motors. The servoloops maintained the inner gimbal rotationally fixed in inertial space. That is, while the vehicle rolled, pitched, and yawed, the inner gimbal remained in the same attitude to which it was set just before launch. Though it was being translated during the launch and orbit process, it was rotationally fixed.
- Three integrating accelerometers measured the three components of velocity resulting from vehicle propulsion. The accelerometer measurements were sent through the launch vehicle data adapter (LDVA at location 19) to the LVDC. In the LVDC the accelerometer measurements were combined with the computed gravitational acceleration to obtain velocity and position of the vehicle.

The angular positions of gimbals on their axes were measured by resolvers, which sent their signals to the Launch Vehicle Data Adaptor (LVDA). The LVDA was the input/output device for the LVDC. It performed the necessary processing of signals to make these signals acceptable to the LVDC.

The instantaneous attitude of the vehicle was compared with the desired vehicle attitude in the LVDC. Attitude correction signals from the LVDC were converted into control commands by the flight control computer. The required thrust direction was obtained by gimbaling the engines in the propelling stage to change the thrust direction of the vehicle. Gimbaling of these engines was accomplished through hydraulic actuators. In the first and second stages (S-IC and S-II), the four outboard engines were gimbaled to control roll, pitch, and yaw. Since the third (S-IVB) stage has only one engine, an auxiliary propulsion system was used for roll control during powered flight. The auxiliary propulsion system provides complete attitude control during coast flight of the S-IVB/IU stage.

==== Control/EDS - Rate Gyro Assembly (RGA) Package ====
Mounted at location 15, the nine (triple-redundant) "Rate Gyroscopes" for angular rates (pitch, roll, and yaw), were used for "real time" attitude stabilization and the Emergency Detection System (EDS).

The angular rate signals were sent to the Control Signal Processor (CSP) for signal voting and then continuously input (i.e. at a high frequency, in real time) to the analog Flight Control Computer (FCC), a task that would have overwhelmed the digital computer. The FCC's damping computations were necessary for stabilizing the vehicle's angular motion during flight. The final command to the engine actuators was a complex, filtered sum of several analog inputs. The FCC's analog components performed complex weighting, integration, and filtering instantaneously and continuously—at a speed necessary for vehicle stability that the 1960s-era digital computers (like the LVDC) could not match. Thus the digital computer provided the strategic steering while the analog FCC provided the tactical, high-speed stability control.

The engine-out sensors and the cables for monitoring structural integrity were distributed throughout the rocket stages, but the final decision-making logic to act on those inputs resided within the EDS components in the IU. This component housed dedicated solid-state logic circuitry that formed the core of the automatic abort system. It functioned on preset abort rules (e.g., "two or more engine failures" or "excessive vehicle rate" of pitch, roll, or yaw).

=== Emergency detection ===
The emergency detection system (EDS) sensed initial development of conditions in the flight vehicle during the boost phases of flight which could cause vehicle failure. The EDS reacted to these emergency situations in one of two ways. If breakup of the vehicle were imminent, an automatic abort sequence would be initiated. If, however, the emergency condition were developing slowly enough or were of such a nature that the flight crew can evaluate it and take action, only visual indications were provided to the flight crew. Once an abort sequence had been initiated, either automatically or manually, it was irrevocable and ran to completion.

The EDS was distributed throughout the vehicle and includes some components in the IU. There were nine EDS rate gyros installed at location 15 in the IU. Three gyros monitored each of the three axes (pitch, roll and yaw), providing triple redundancy. The control signal processor (location 15) provided power to and received inputs from the nine EDS rate gyros. These inputs were processed and sent to the EDS distributor (location 14) and to the flight control computer (location 16). The EDS distributor served as a junction box and switching device to furnish the spacecraft display panels with emergency signals if emergency conditions existed. It also contained relay and diode logic for the automatic abort sequence. An electronic timer (location 17) was activated at liftoff and 30 seconds later energized relays in the EDS distributor which allowed multiple engine shutdown. This function was inhibited during the first 30 seconds of launch, to preclude the vehicle falling back into the launch area. While the automatic abort was inhibited, the flight crew could initiate a manual abort if an angular-overrate or two-engine-out condition arose.

=== Environmental control ===
The environmental control system (ECS) maintains an acceptable operating environment for the IU equipment during preflight and flight operations. The ECS is composed of the following:

- The thermal conditioning system (TCS), which maintains a circulating coolant temperature to the electronic equipment of 59° ± 1 °F (15 ± 0.6 °C).
- Preflight purging system, which maintains a supply of temperature- and pressure-regulated mixture of air and gaseous nitrogen (air/GN2) in the IU/S-IVB equipment area.
- Gas bearing supply system, which furnishes GN2 to the ST-124-M3 inertial platform gas bearings.
- Hazardous gas detection sampling equipment which monitors the IU/S-IVB forward interstage area for the presence of hazardous vapors

==== Thermal conditioning ====
Thermal conditioning panels, also called cold plates, were located in both the IU and S-IVB stage (up to sixteen in each stage). Each cold plate contains tapped bolt holes in a grid pattern which provides flexibility of component mounting.

The cooling fluid circulated through the TCS was a mixture of 60 percent methanol and 40 percent demineralized water by weight. Each cold plate was capable of dissipating at least 420 watts.

During flight, heat generated by equipment mounted on the cold plates was dissipated to space by a sublimation heat exchanger. Water from a reservoir (water accumulator) was exposed to the low temperature and pressure environment of space, where it first freezes and then sublimates, taking heat from the heat exchanger and transferring it to the water molecules which escape to space in gaseous state. Water/methanol was cooled by circulation through the heat exchanger.

==== Preflight air/GN2 purge system ====
Before flight, ground support equipment (GSE) supplies cooled, filtered ventilating air to the IU, entering via the large duct in the middle of the umbilical panel (location 7), and branching into two ducts at the top that are carried around the IU in the cable rack. Downward pointing vents from these ducts release ventilating air to the interior of the IU. During fueling, gaseous nitrogen was supplied instead of air, to purge any propellant gases that might otherwise accumulate in the IU.

==== Gas bearing supply ====
To reduce errors in sensing attitude and velocity, designers cut friction to a minimum in the platform gyros and accelerometers by floating the bearings on a thin film of dry nitrogen. The nitrogen was supplied from a sphere holding 2 cu ft (56.6 L) of gas at 3,000 psig (pounds per square inch gauge, i.e. psi above one atmosphere) (20,7 MPa). This sphere is 21 inches (0,53 m) in diameter and is mounted at location 22, to the left of the ST-124-M3. Gas from the supply sphere passes through a filter, a pressure regulator, and a heat exchanger before flowing through the bearings in the stable platform.

==== Hazardous gas detection ====
The hazardous gas detection system monitors the presence of hazardous gases in the IU and S-IVB stage forward compartments during vehicle fueling. Gas was sampled at four locations: between panels 1 and 2, 7 and 8, 13 and 14, and 19 and 20. Tubes lead from these locations to location 7, where they were connected to ground support equipment (external to the IU) which can detect hazardous gases.

=== Radio communications ===
The IU communicated by radio continually to ground for several purposes. The measurement and telemetry system communicated data about internal processes and conditions on the Saturn V. The tracking system communicated data used by the Mission Ground Station (MGS) to determine vehicle location. The radio command system allowed the MGS to send commands up to the IU.

==== Measuring and telemetry ====
Approximately 200 parameters were measured on the IU and transmitted to the ground, in order to

- Assist in the checkout of the launch vehicle prior to launch,
- Determine vehicle condition and to verify received commands during flight, and
- Facilitate postflight analysis of the mission.

Parameters measured include acceleration, angular velocity, flow rate, position, pressure, temperature, voltage, current, frequency, and others. Sensor signals were conditioned by amplifiers or converters located in measuring racks. There are four measuring racks in the IU at locations 1, 9, and 15 and twenty signal conditioning modules in each. Conditioned signals were routed to their assigned telemetry channel by the measuring distributor at location 10. There were two telemetry links. In order for the two IU telemetry links to handle approximately 200 separate measurements, these links must be shared. Both frequency sharing and time sharing multiplexing techniques were used to accomplish this. The two modulation techniques used were pulse-code modulation/frequency modulation (PCM/FM) and frequency modulation/frequency modulation (FM/FM).

Two Model 270 time sharing multiplexers (MUX-270) were used in the IU telemetry system, mounted at locations 9 and 10. Each one operates as a 30×120 multiplexer (30 primary channels, each sampled 120 times per second) with provisions for submultiplexing individual primary channels to form 10 subchannels each sampled at 12 times per second. Outputs from the MUX-270 go to the PCM/DDAS assembly model 301 at location 12, which in turn drives the 245.3 MHz PCM VHF transmitter.

The FM/FM signals were carried in 28 subcarrier channels and transmitted by a 250.7 MHz FM transmitter.

Both the FM/FM and the PCM/FM channels were coupled to the two telemetry antennas on opposite sides of the IU outside locations 10 and 22.

==== Tracking ====
C-band radar transponders carried by the IU provided tracking data to the ground which were used to determine the vehicle's trajectory. The transponder received coded or single pulse interrogation from ground stations and transmitted a single-pulse reply in the same frequency band (5.4 to 5.9 GHz). A common antenna was used for receiving and transmitting. The C-band transponder antennas are outside locations 11 and 23, immediately below CCS PCM omni receive antennas.

==== Radio command ====
The command communications system (CCS) provided for digital data transmission from ground stations to the LVDC. This communications link was used to update guidance information or command certain other functions through the LVDC. Command data originated in the Mission Control Center, Houston, and was sent to remote stations for transmission to the launch vehicle. Command messages were transmitted from the ground at 2101.8 MHz. The received message was passed to the command decoder (location 18), where it was checked for authenticity before being passed to the LVDC. Verification of message receipt was accomplished through the IU PCM telemetry system. The CCS system used five antennas:

- A single directional antenna outside location 3–4,
- Two omni transmit antennas outside locations 11 and 23, and
- Two omni receive antennas outside locations 12 and 24.

=== Power ===
Power during flight originated with four silver-zinc batteries with a nominal voltage of 28±2 vdc. Battery D10 sat on a shelf at location 5, batteries D30 and D40 were on shelves in location 4, and battery D20 was at location 24. Two power supplies converted the unregulated battery power to regulated 56 vdc and 5 vdc. The 56 vdc power supply was at location 1 and provided power to the ST-124-M3 platform electronic assembly and the accelerometer signal conditioner. The 5 vdc power supply at location 12 provided 5 ±.005 vdc to the IU measuring system.

== Gallery ==
These images show the development of the IU. The first four Saturn launches did not have an IU, but used guidance, telemetry and other equipment installed on top of the first stage.

The first IU flew on the fifth Saturn launch, SA-5, and was 12 feet 10 inches (3.91 m) in diameter and 4 feet 10 inches (1.47 m) high. The components it carried were in pressurized containers. This version flew on SA-5, SA-6 and SA-7. The IU carried by missions SA-8, -9, and -10 was only 2 feet 10 inches (0.86 m) high, and was not pressurized.

With the Saturn IB and Saturn V launches, a third version was used, 21.6 feet (6.6 m) in diameter and 3 feet (0.91 m) high. Comparison of these photographs of the instrument unit shows that the configuration of components carried by this version changed, depending on the mission. Some equipment was deleted (e.g., the Azusa tracking system was deleted from later IUs), some equipment was added (e.g., a fourth battery for longer missions), and other components were moved around.

These images also show that some components (e.g., batteries, the ST-124 inertial platform) were installed in the IU after it had been stacked in the VAB on top of the S-IVB third stage.

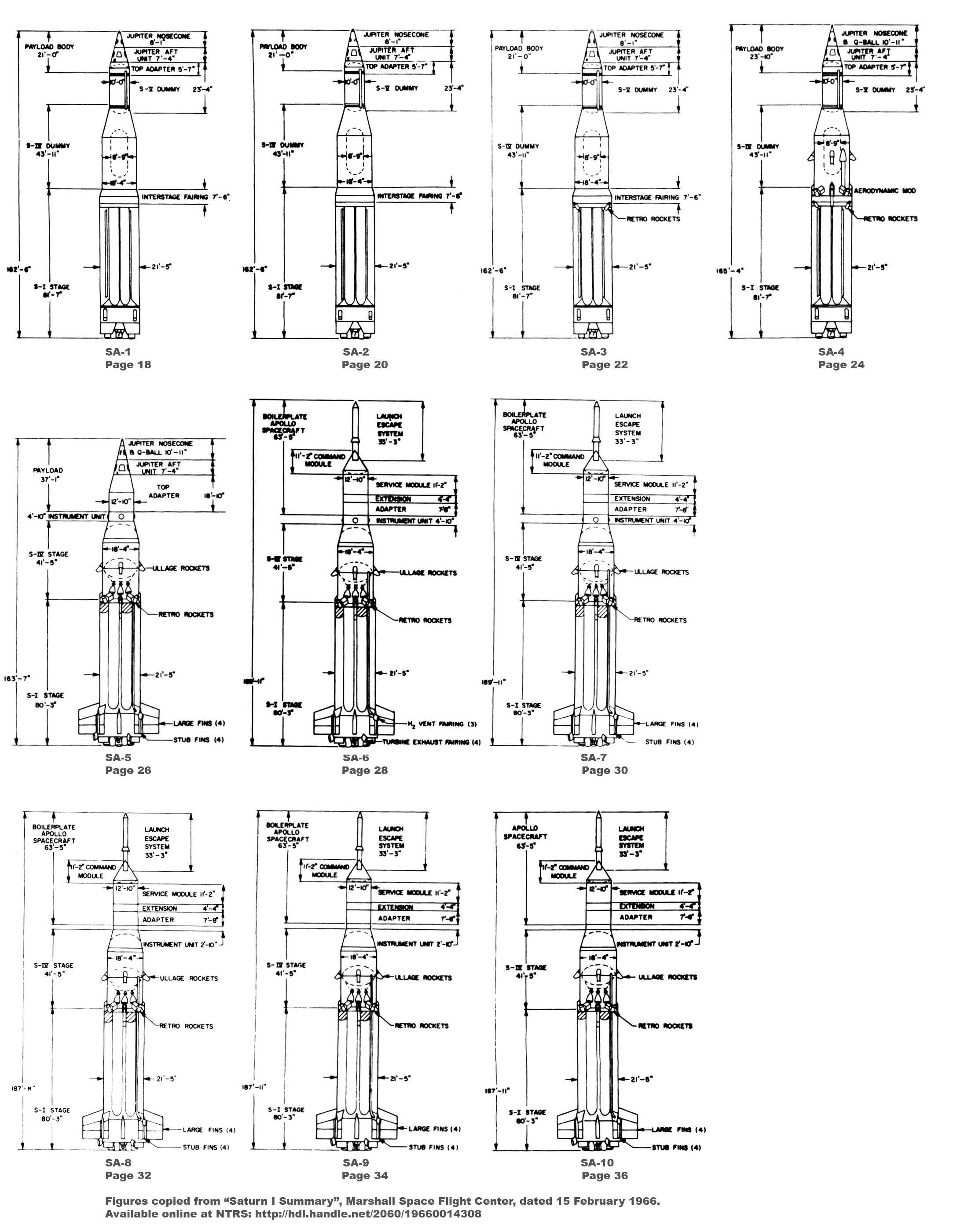
Saturn I vehicles compared. No IU on SA-1 to -4; version 1 on SA-5 to -7; version 2 on SA-8 to -10.

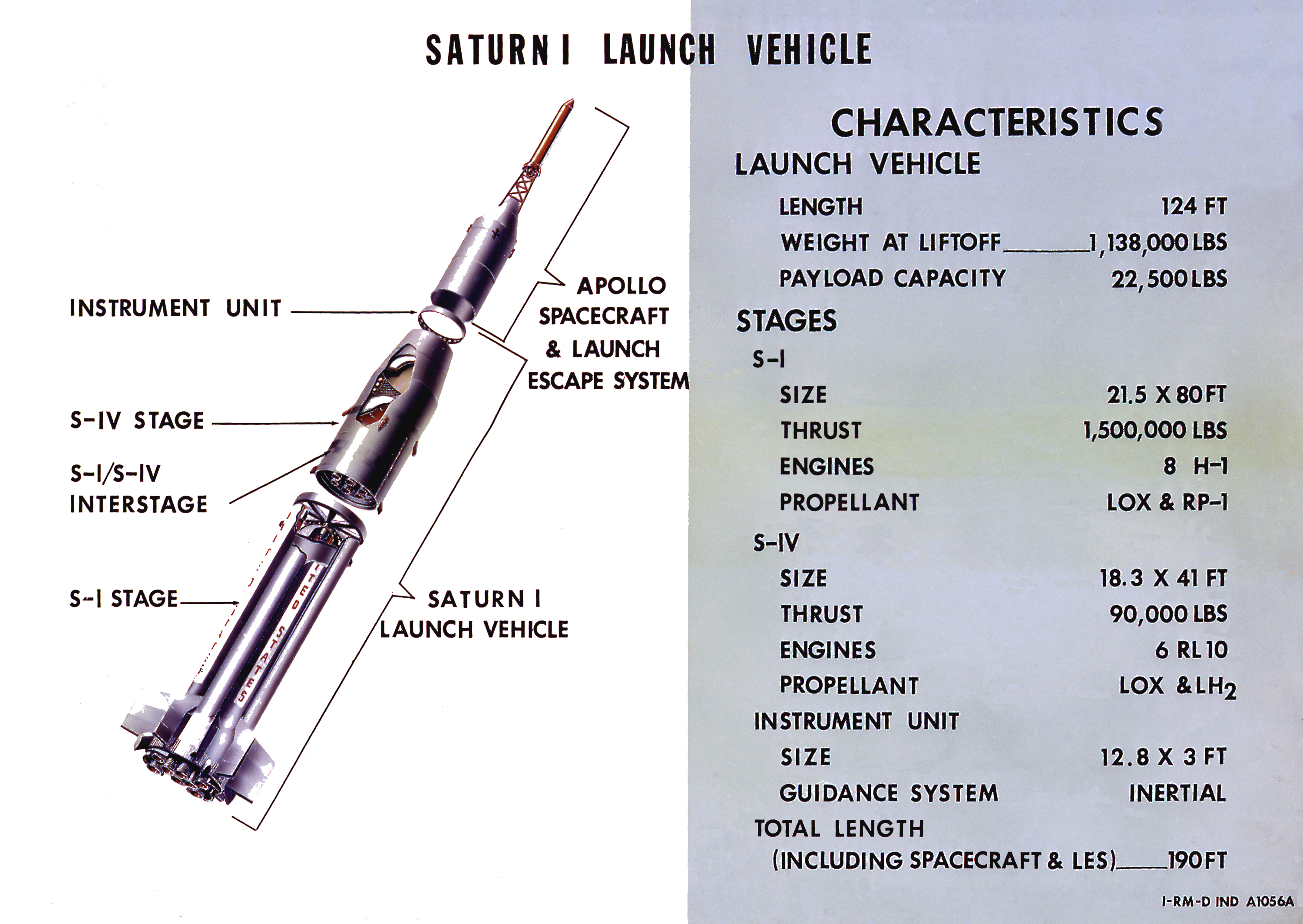
Saturn I configuration

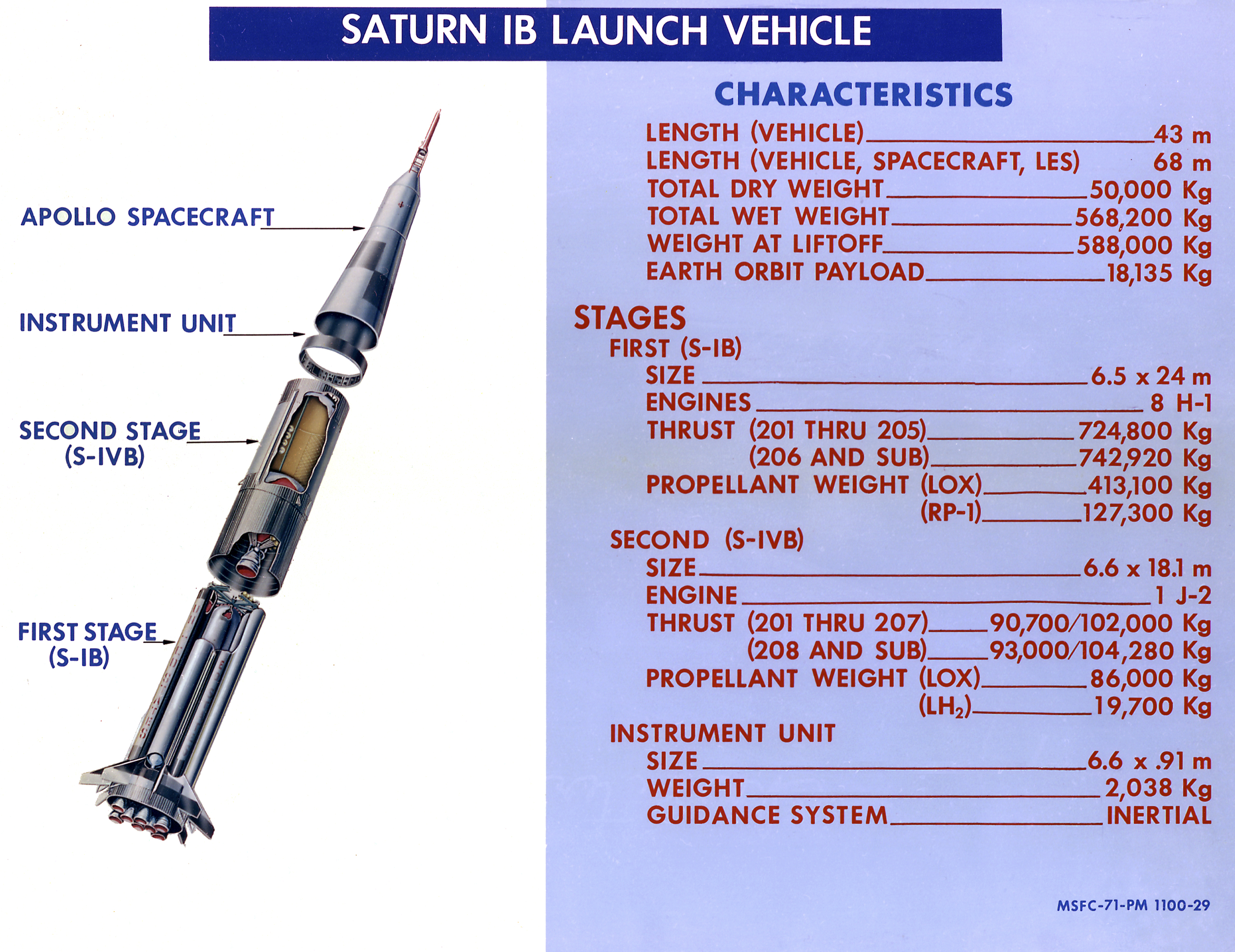
Saturn IB configuration

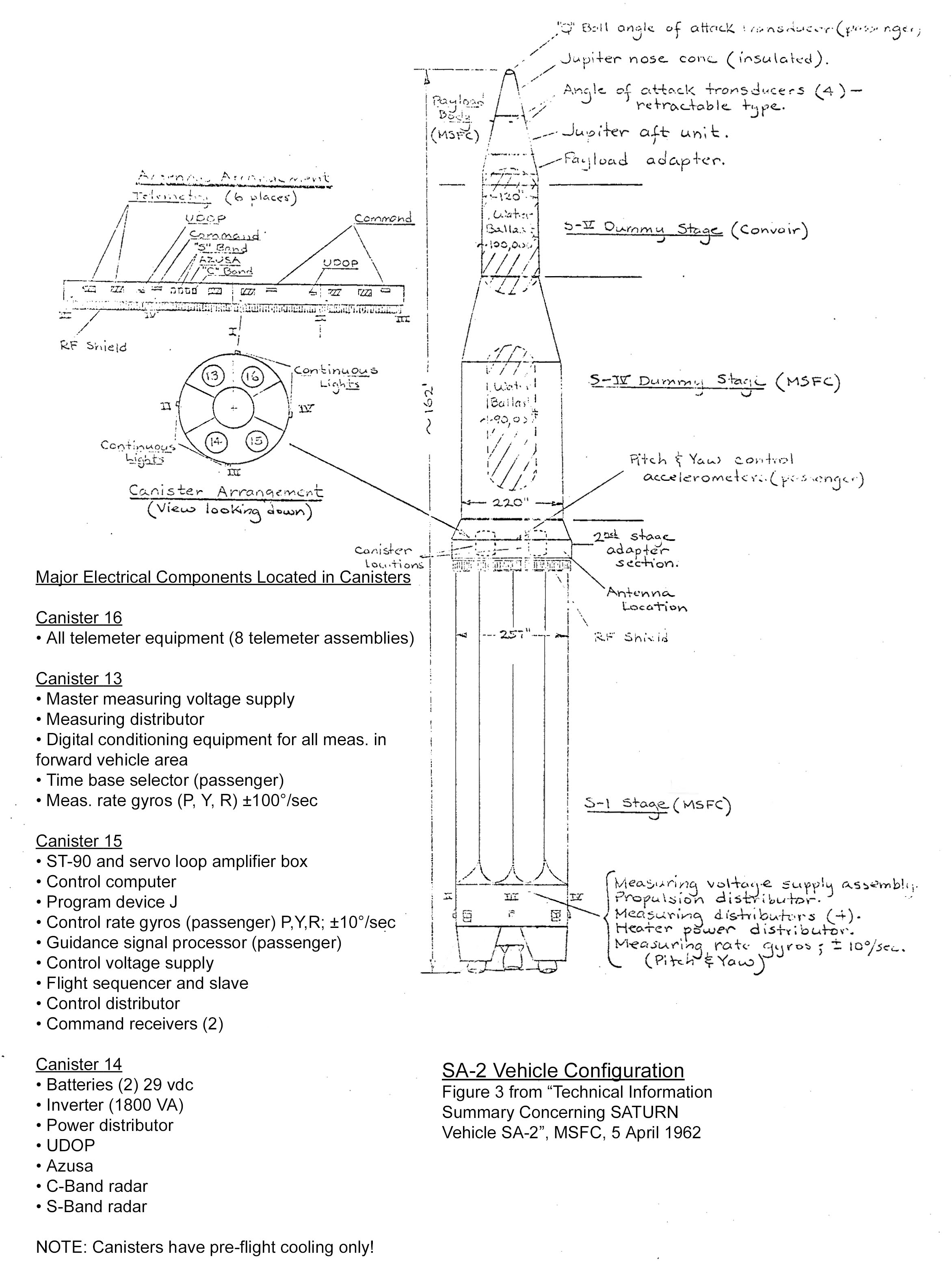
Before the instrument unit, Saturn guidance components were contained in canisters.

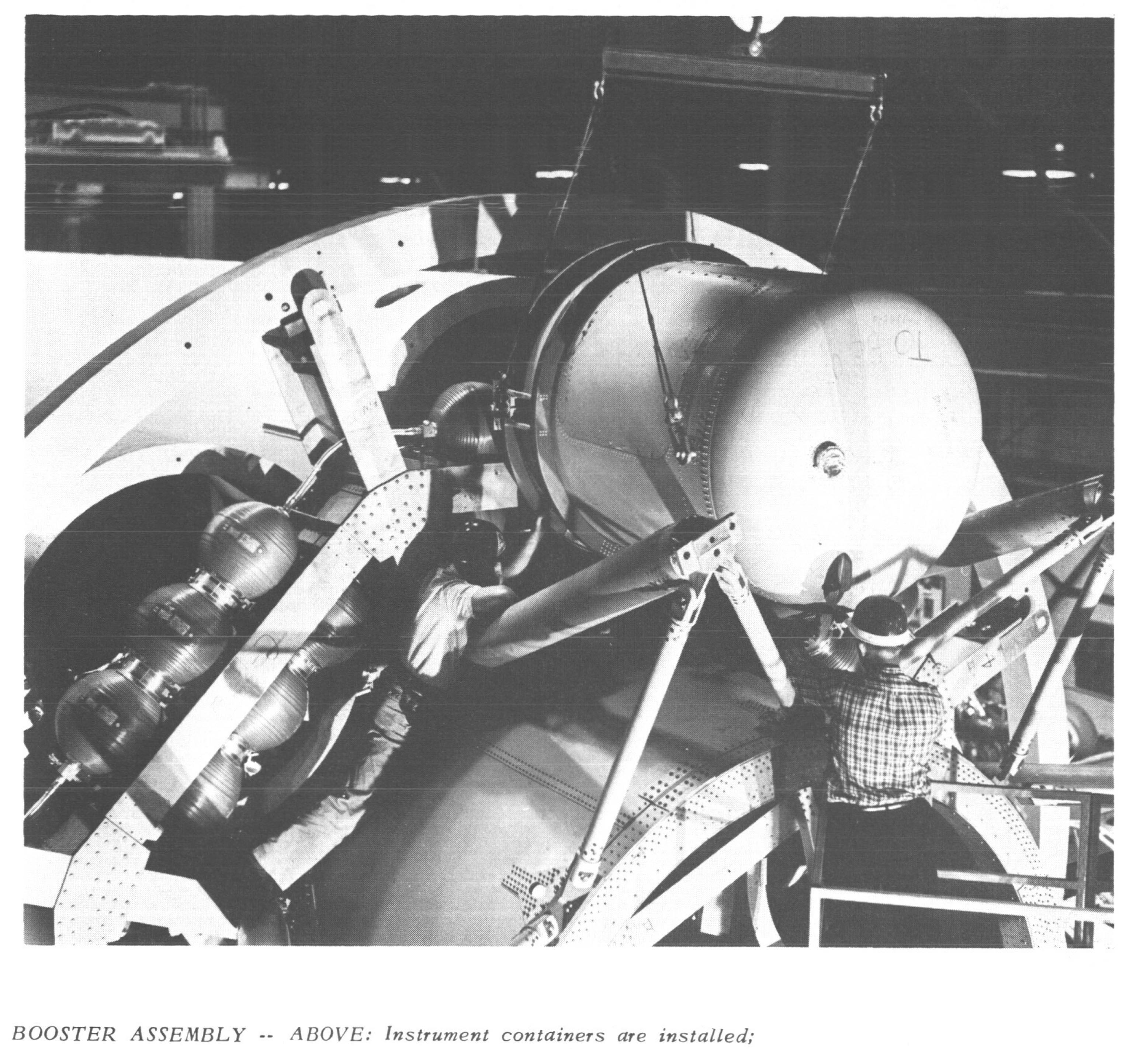
Canisters being installed in forward end of S-1 stage

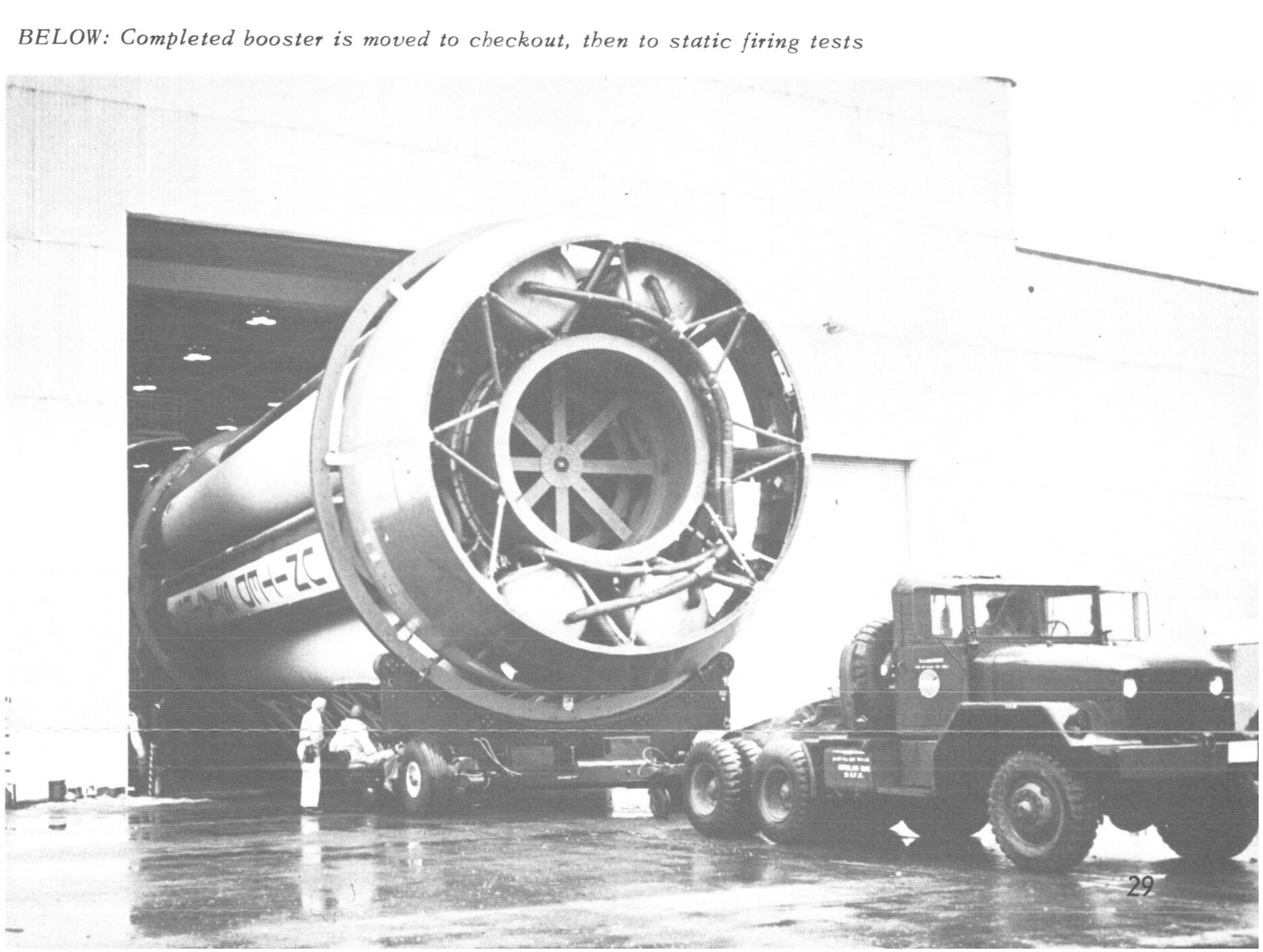
S-1 stage with canisters in the forward end

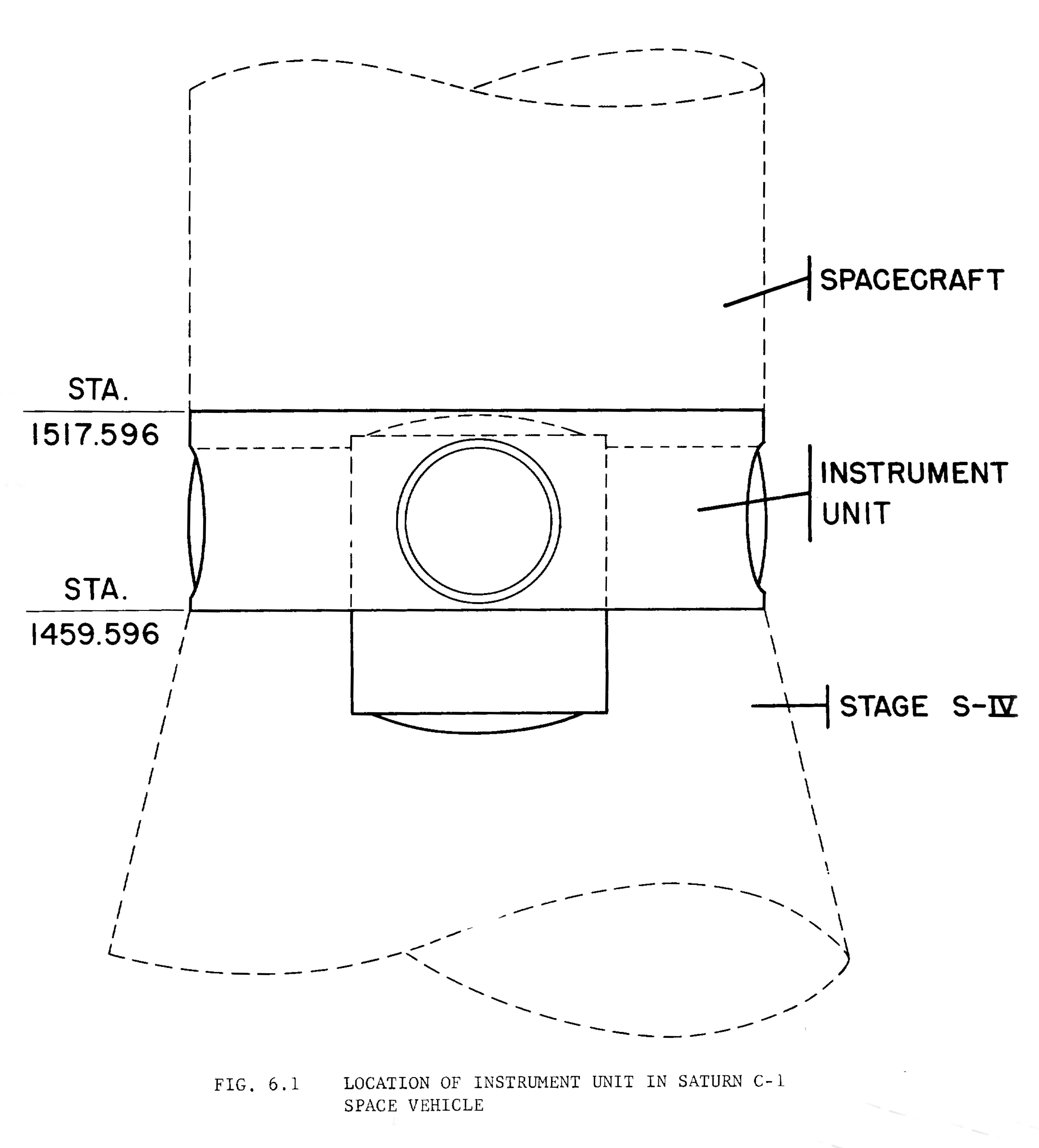
IU version 1 dimensions

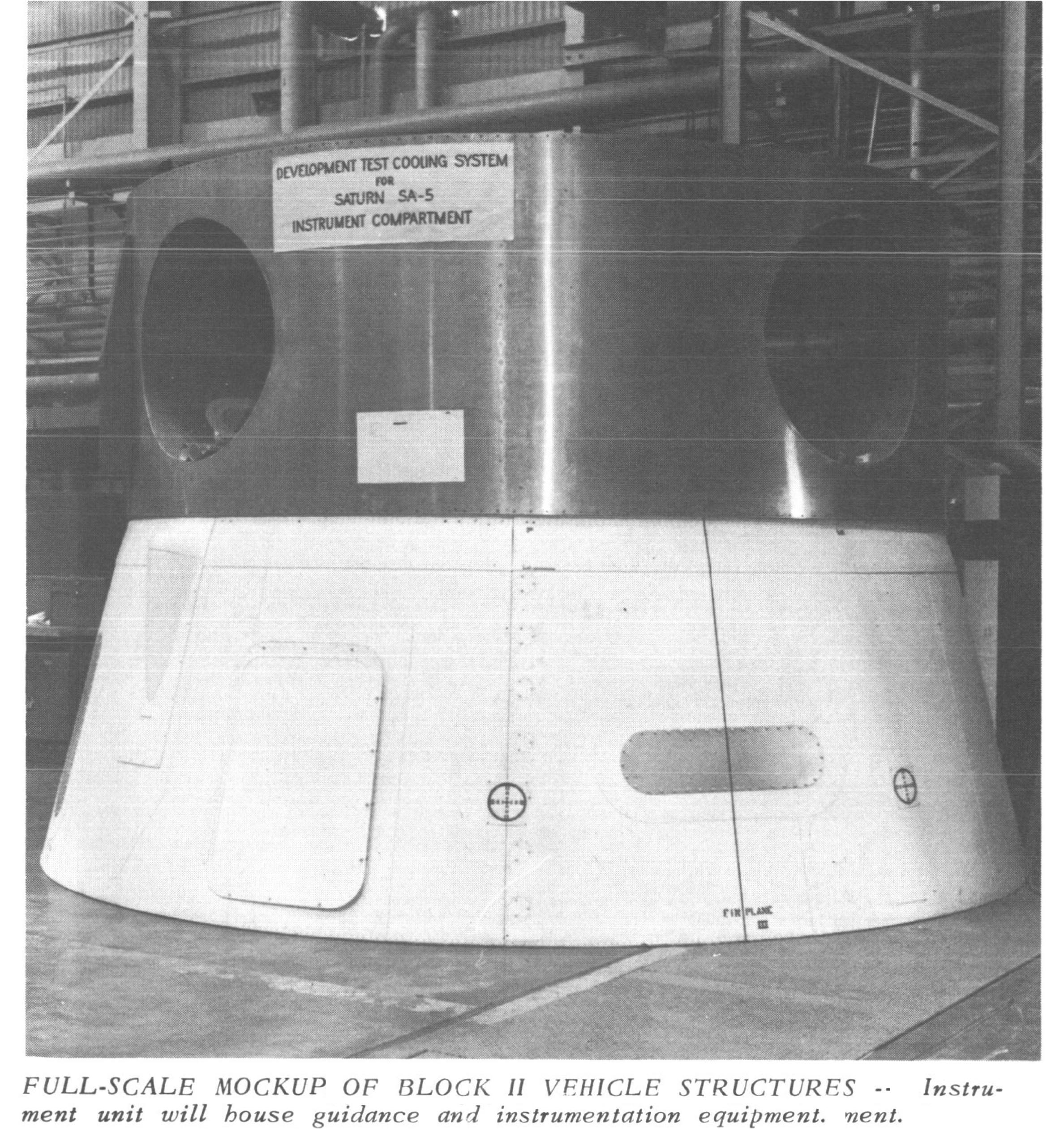
Mockup of version 1 of the instrument unit

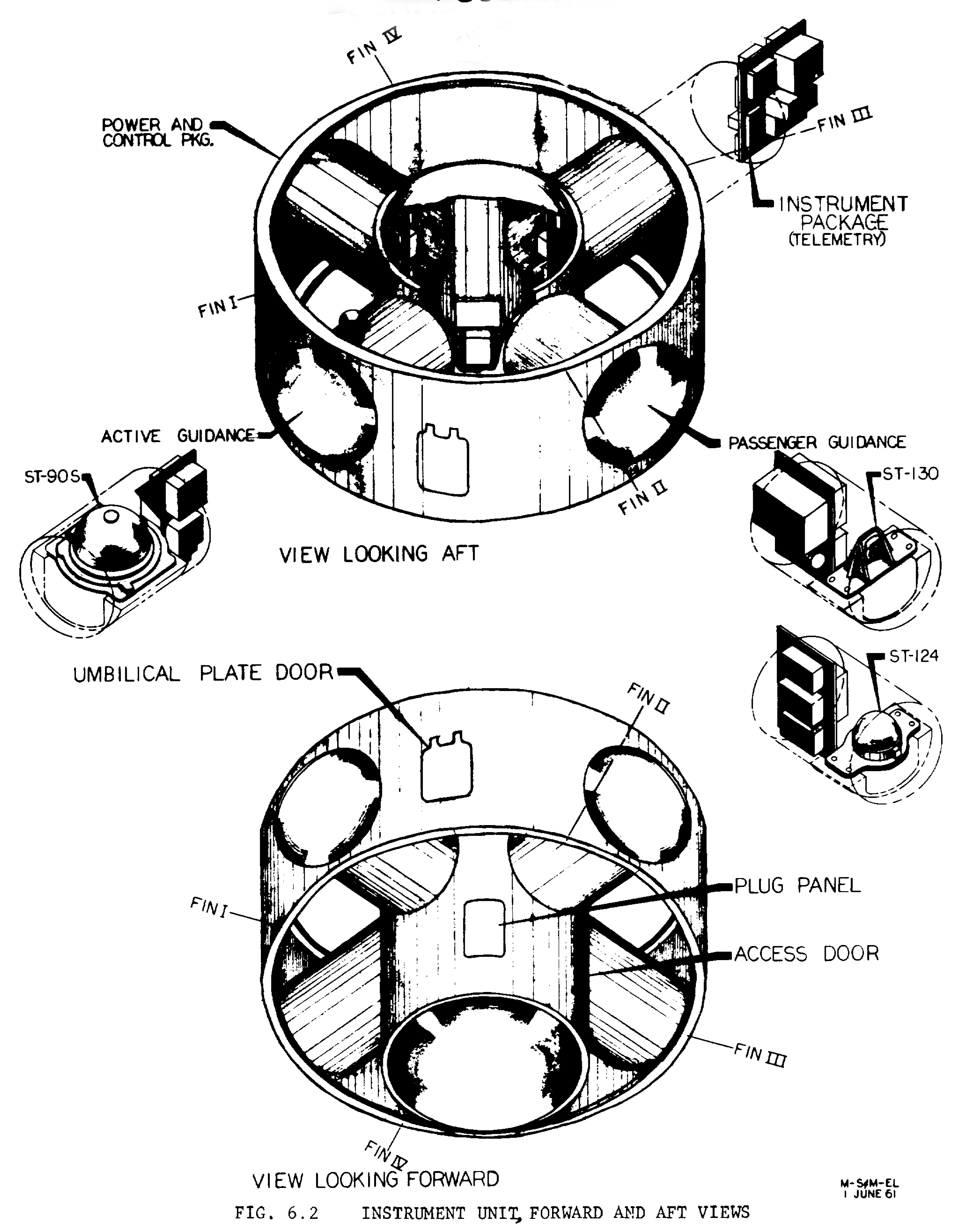
Exploded view of version 1 of the instrument unit

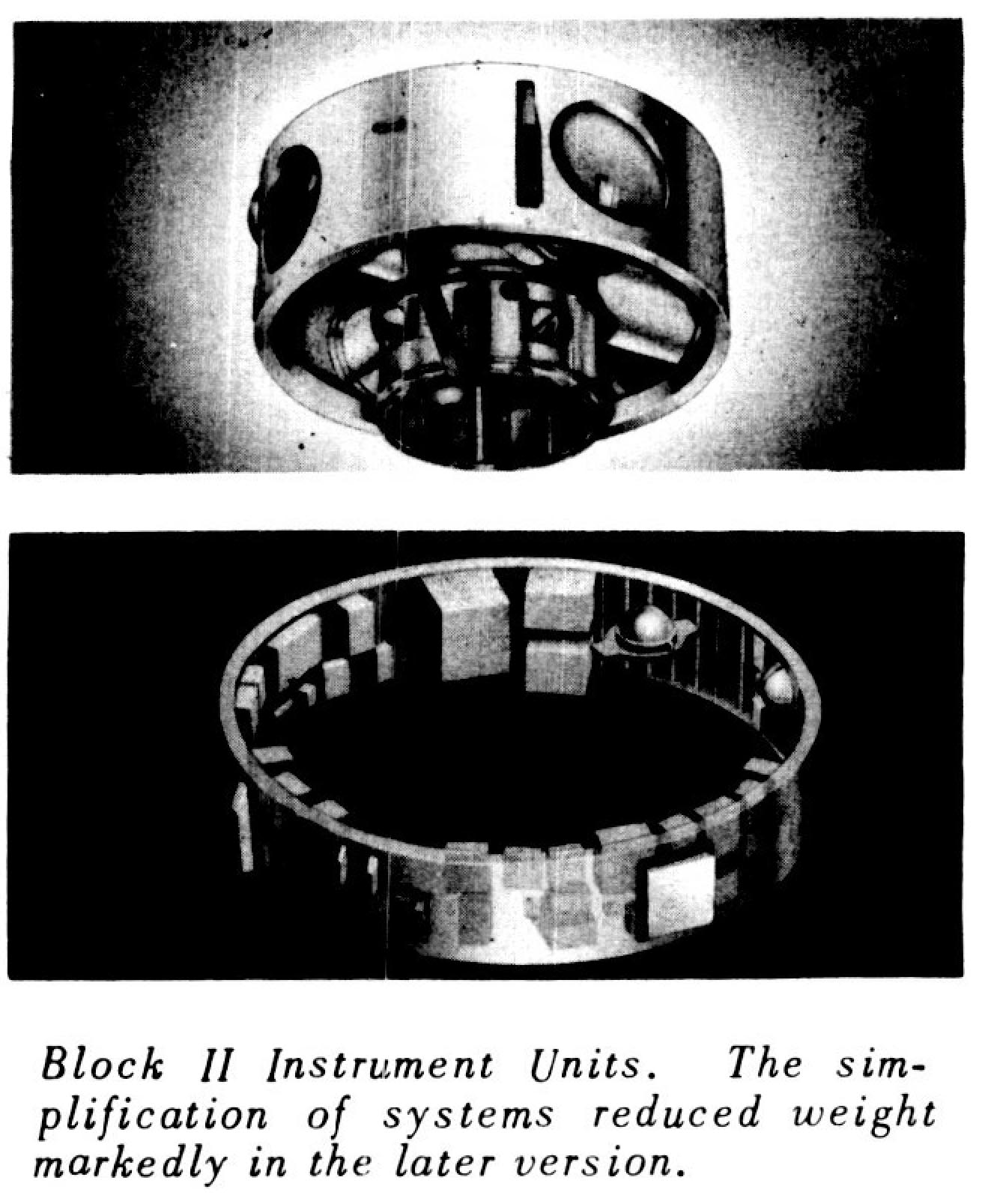
Versions 1 and 2 of the IU

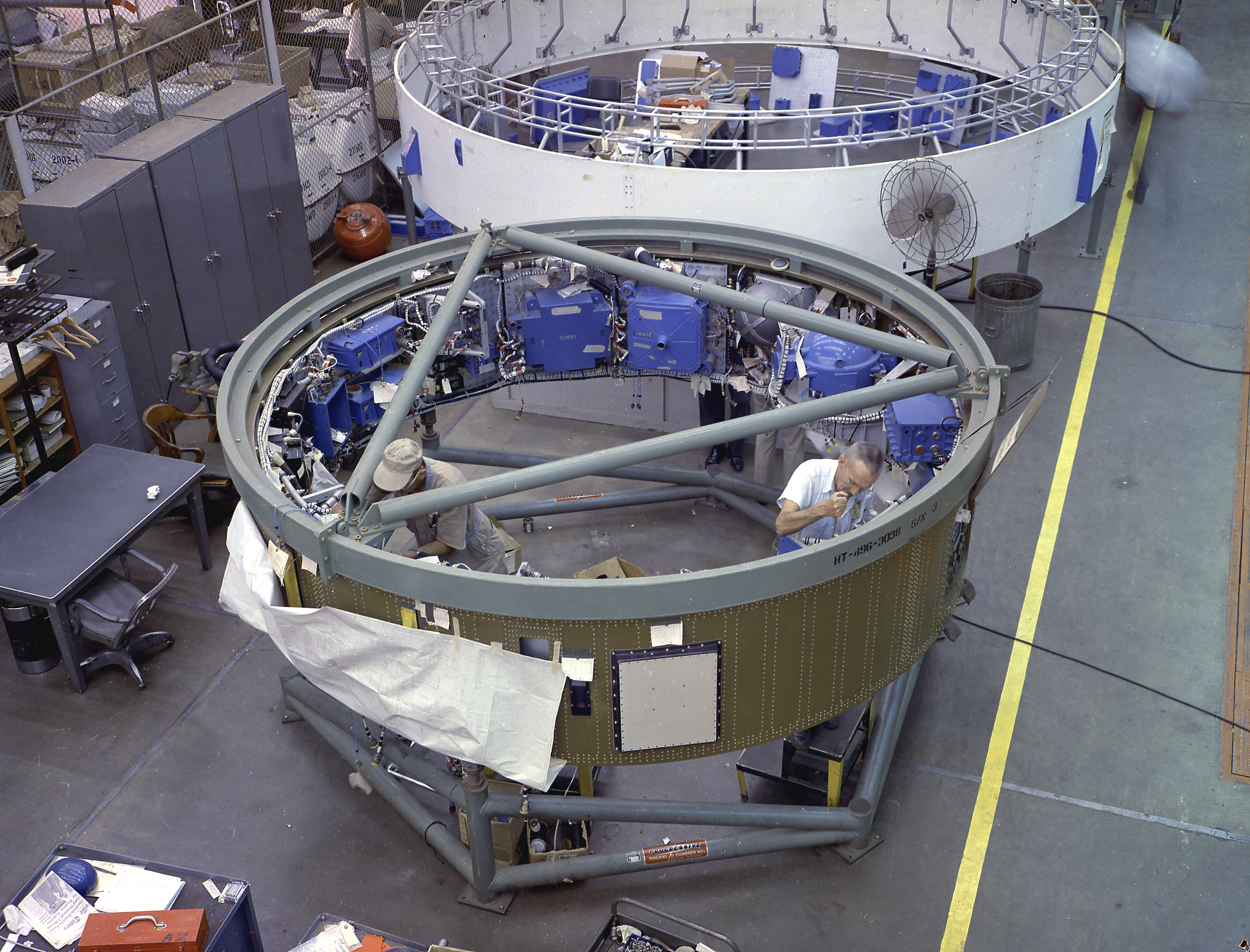
Early instrument unit at Marshall Space Flight Center Building 4705

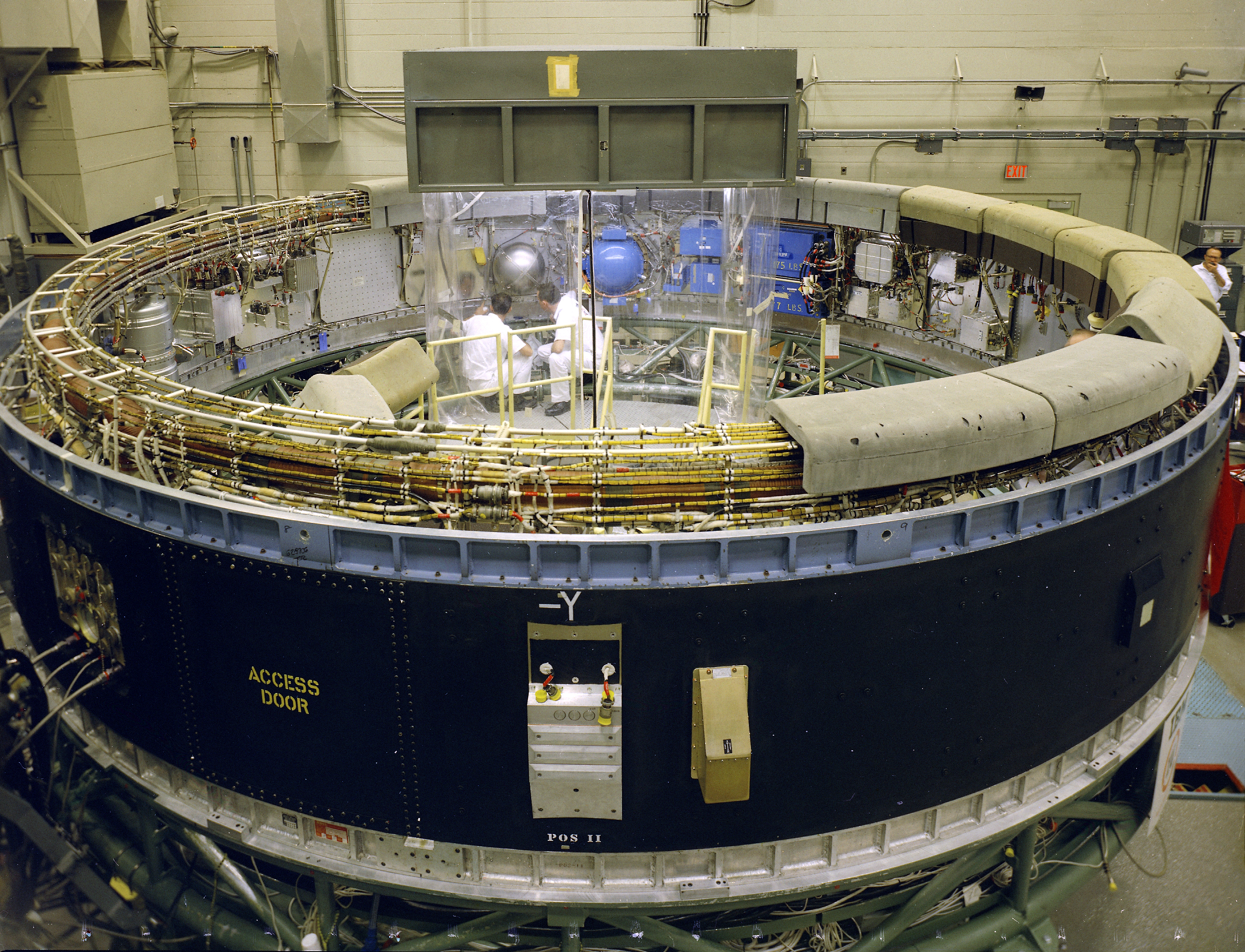
IU at IBM plant in Huntsville

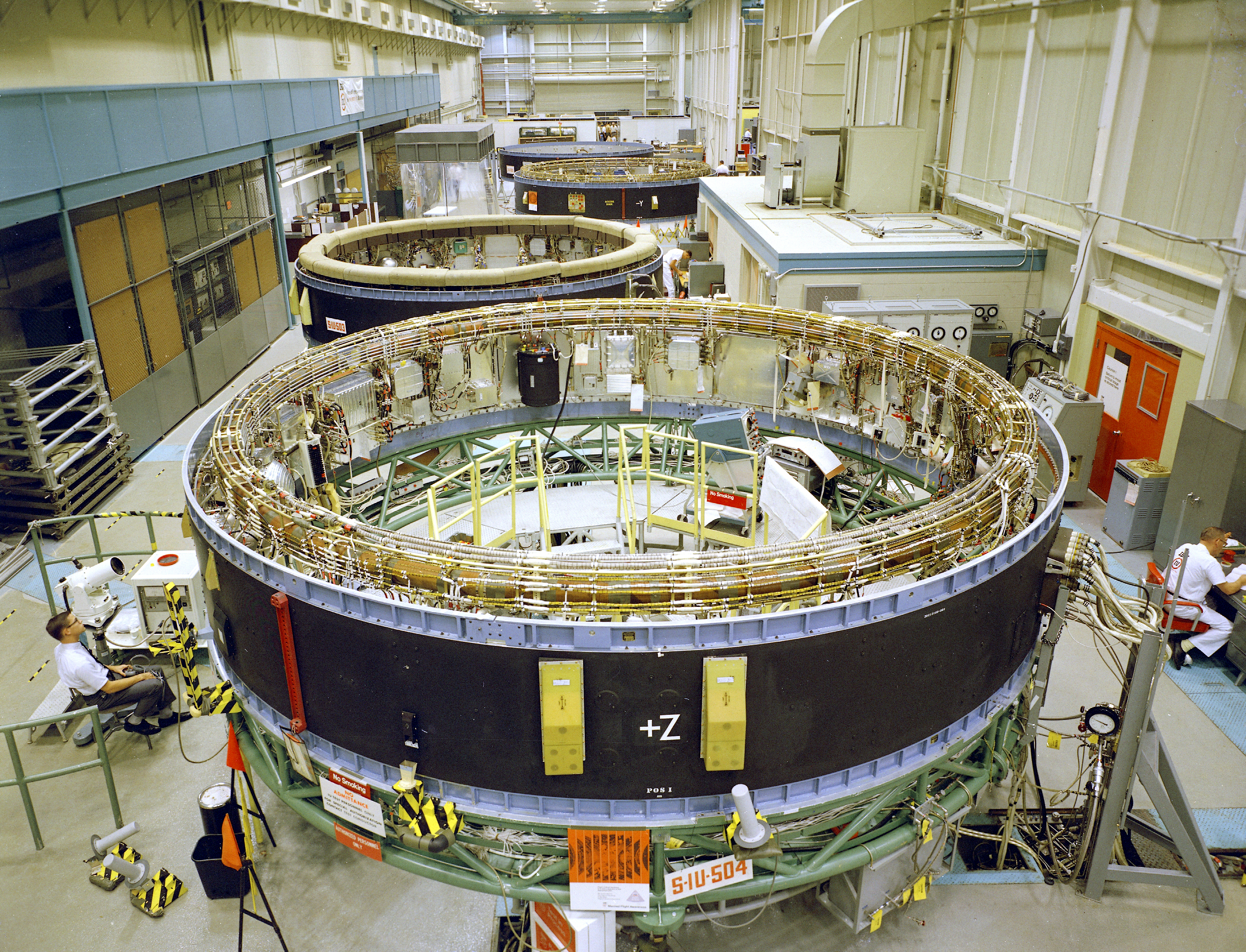
Four IUs in the IBM plant at Huntsville

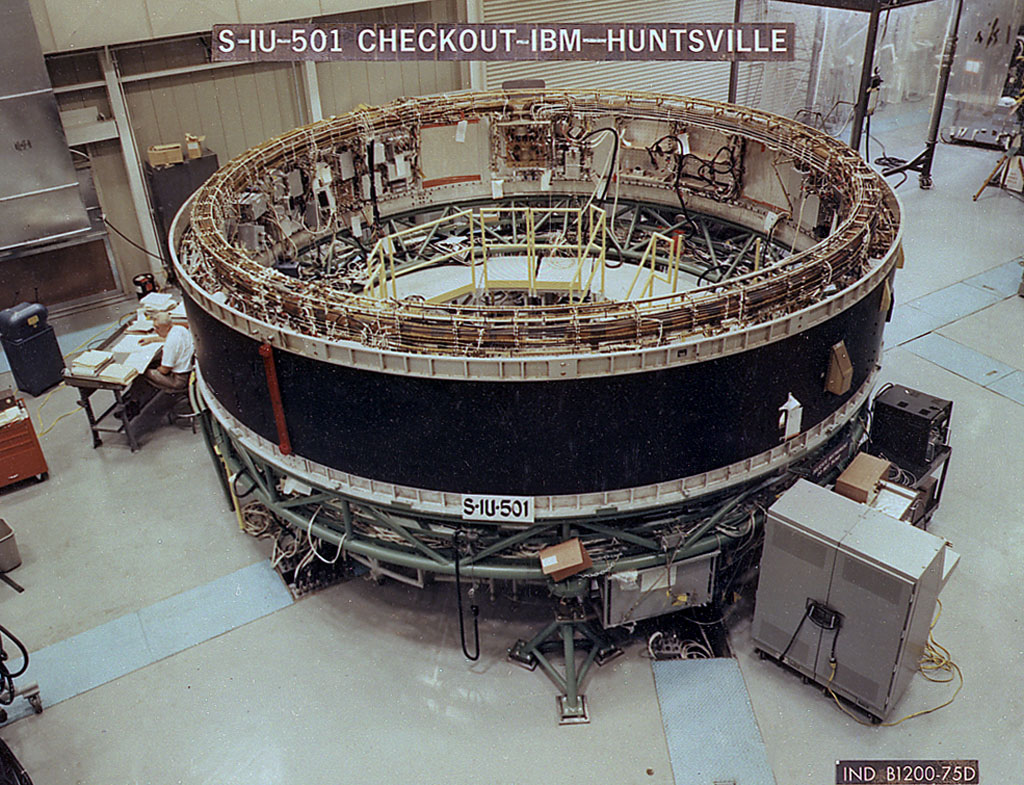
IU-501 flew on the Apollo 4 mission

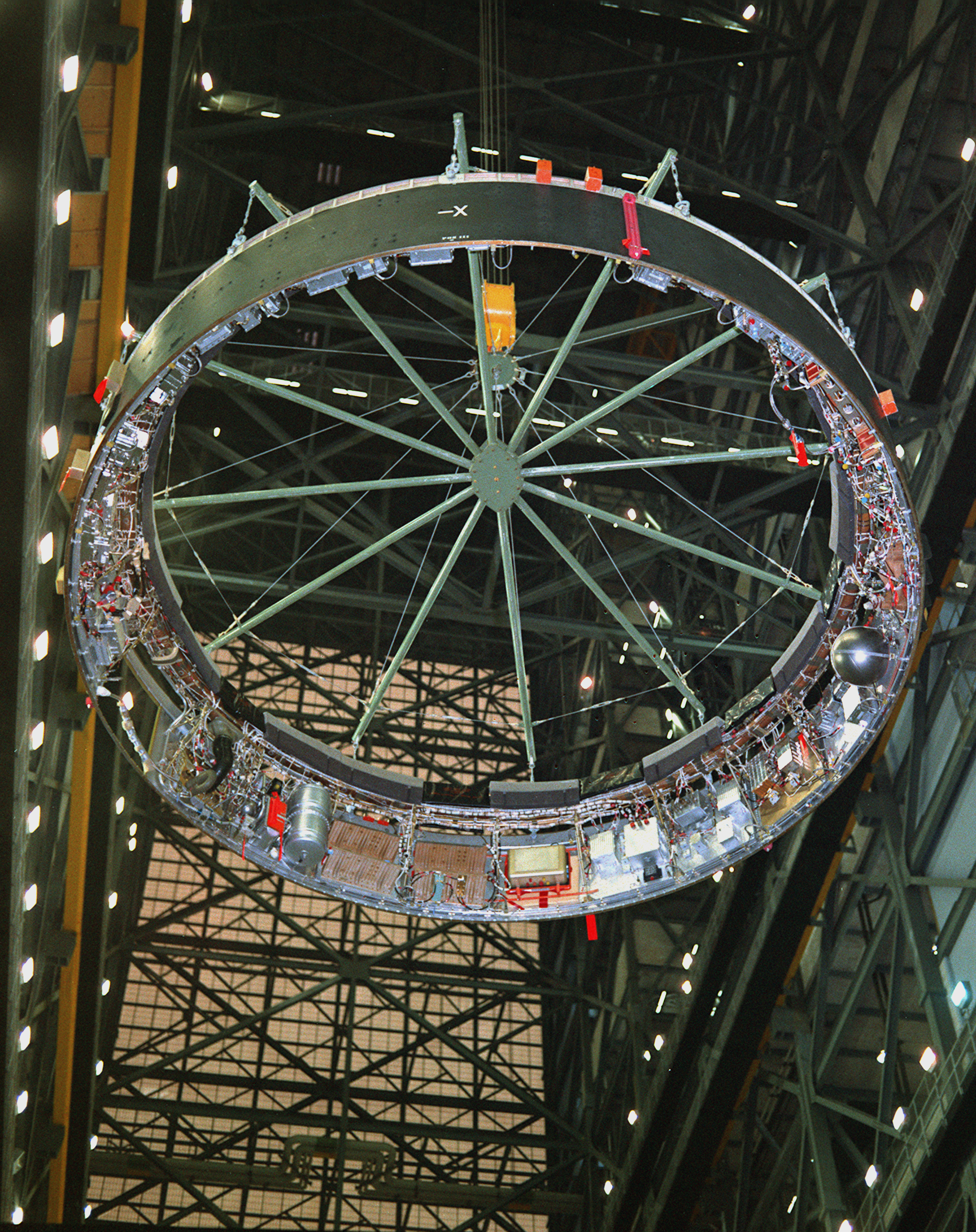
IU-501 from below in the VAB

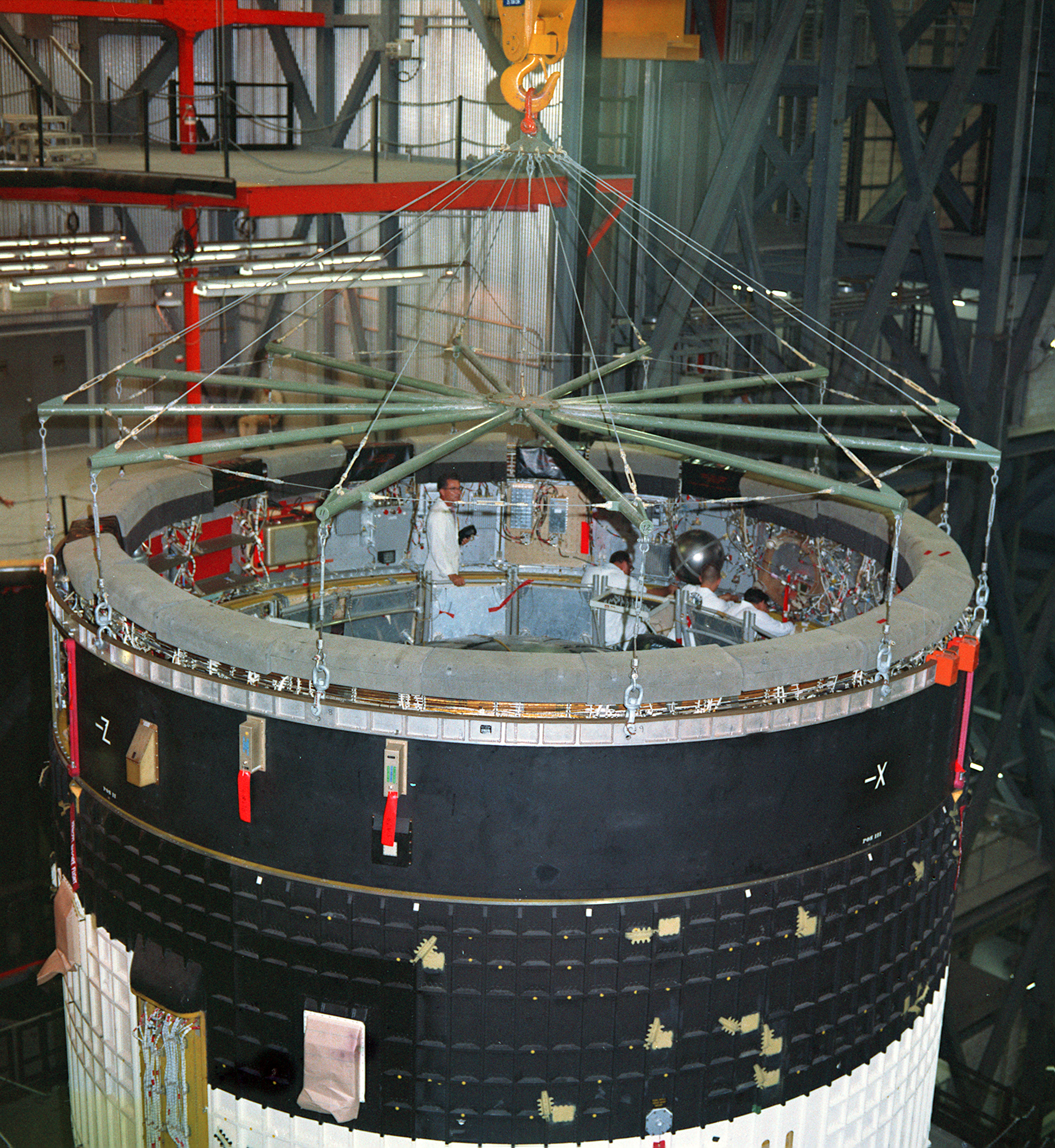
IU-501 on top of the S-IVB in the stack for the Apollo 4 mission (SA-501)

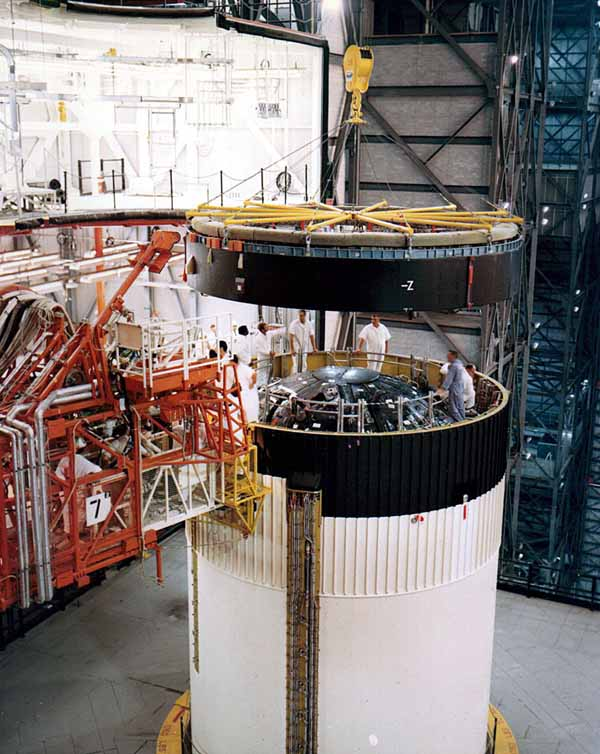
IU-502 above the S-IVB stage in the VAB on July 14, 1967

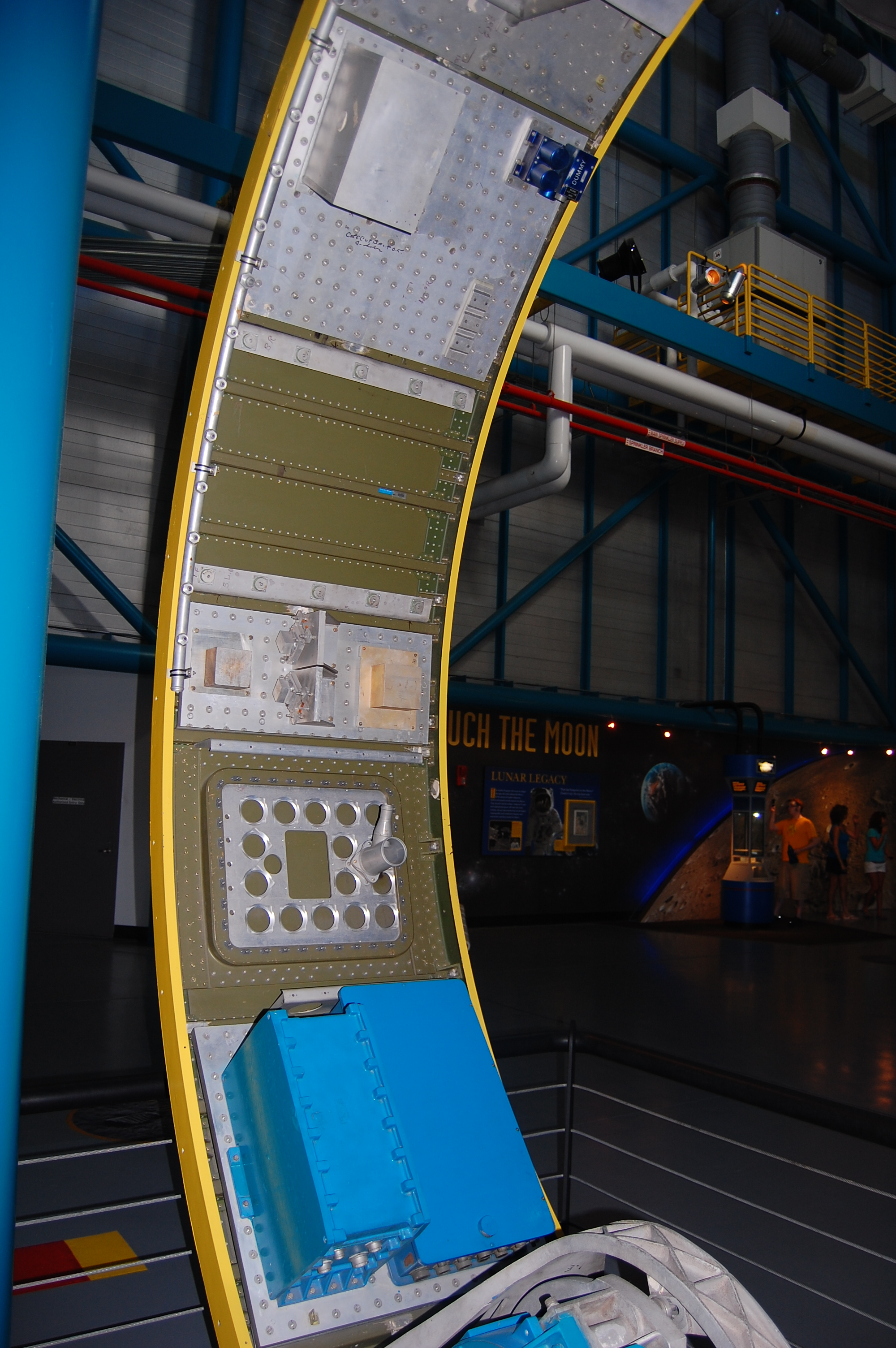
SA-514 IU on display at the Apollo/Saturn V Center
