= JOM =

JOM may refer to:

- Jom (weekly Singapore magazine)
- Jom or the History of a people, film
- JOM (journal), formerly known as Journal of Metals
- Journal of Macroeconomics
- Journal of Macromarketing
- Journal of Mammalogy
- Journal of Management
- Journal of Marketing
- Journal of Materials
- Journal of Mathematics
- Journal of Medicine
- Journal of Meningitis
- Journal of Meteorology
- Journal of Microencapsulation
- Journal of Microscopy
- Journal of Morphology
- Journal of Multimedia
- Journal of Music
- Journal of Mycology
