= Ababacar Samb Makharam =

Senegalese filmmaker (1934–1987)

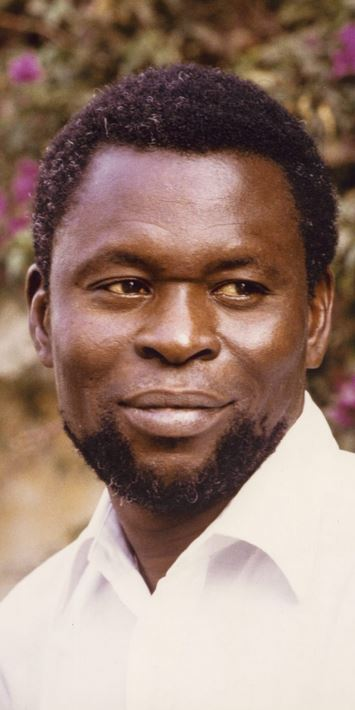
- 2023
- Born: 21 October 1934; Dakar, Senegal
- Died: 7 October 1987 (aged 52); Dakar
- Occupations: Film director, actor, camera operator, screenwriter, and film producer
- Notable work: Kodou, 1971; Jom (ou L'Histoire d'un peuple), 1982.
- Awards: Prix Georges Sadoul

Ababacar Samb Makharam (21 October 1934 – 7 October 1987), also spelt Ababacar Samb-Makharam, was a Senegalese filmmaker. His film production company was called Baobab Films.

== Early life and education ==
Samb Makharam was born in Dakar, Senegal, on 21 October 1934.

He attended the Senegalese Navy school, Centre de Formation Professionnelle de la Marine de Dakar, in 1950–1951, and worked in a law firm (1952–1953). He then left for Paris, France, and attended the École française de radioélectricité Rue Amyot (1954–1955, now EFREI Paris).

In 1955 Samb Makharam founded the Paris theatre group Les Griots, uniting various Antillean and African actors such as Timité Bassori, Toto Bissainthe, Robert Liensol, and Sarah Maldoror.

From 1955 until 1958 Samb Makharam trained as an actor at the Centre d'Art Dramatique de la Rue Blanche.

From 1959 to 1962 he was a cinema student at the Centro Sperimentale di Cinematografia (Experimental Film Centre) in Rome, after which he travelled in the United States for further study (1962–1963).

== Career ==
While studying as an actor in Paris, Samb Makharam performed in the films Tamango (1957) directed by John Berry and Les Tripes au soleil (1958) by Claude Bernard-Aubert.

After studying in the US and Italy, he returned to France to join the Office de Radiodiffusion Télévision Française (ORTF) as an assistant director for television.

Samb Makharam worked as an actor, camera operator, screenwriter, film and television director, and film producer over the course of his career.

On returning to Senegal in 1964, Samb Makharam worked for the Ministry of Information there, was a cameraman with the Senegalese TV news, and served as a director and producer at Radio Sénégal (Dakar).

In 1965 he directed his first feature film Et la neige n'etait plus / There Was No Longer Snow, followed by Kodou in 1971. He founded his own film production company, Baobab Films.

He pioneered a new style with a timeless role for the traditional Senegalese griot in his 1982 movie Jom ou L'Histoire d'un Peuple (Jom or the History of a People).

== Other activities ==
Samb Makharam served as the secretary general of the Pan African Federation of Filmmakers (FEPACI) from 1971 to 1977.

== Death and legacy ==
Samb Makharam died in Dakar on 7 October 1987 at the age of 52.

== Theatre ==
Between 1955 and 1964 Samb Makharam performed as an actor in various productions of his Paris theatre group Les Griots:

Play	Author	Director
L'ombre de La Ravine (In the Shadow of the Glen, 1903)	John Millington Synge	Roger Blin
La Fille des Dieux (1958)	Abdou Anta Ka or Kâ	Roger Blin
Huis-Clos (1944)	Jean Paul Sartre	Roger Blin
Papa Bon Dieu (1958)	Louis Sapin	Michel Vitold

== Filmography ==
Samb Makharam's films include:

Year	Film	Description	Role	Duration
1957	Tamango	Feature film directed by John Berry. Historical drama about a failed slave rebellion on a slave ship.	Actor	98 minutes
1958	Les Tripes au soleil	Feature by Claude Bernard-Aubert. Dramatic comedy about racial segregation and romantic love with a happy ending.	Actor	125 m
1961	L'Ubriaco (L'Ivresse)	Short film, love story. Final exam film at the Centro Sperimentale di Cinematografia, Rome.	Screen writer, film director	5m 34s or 6m
1966	Et la neige n'était plus...	Short, drama. After completing his studies in France a young Senegalese evaluates his past and future on return to his country. First Prize (Grand Prix) at the World Festival of Black Arts (Festival Mondial des Arts Nègres).	Screen writer, film director	22 m
1968	La Terre et le Paysan	Short, black and white documentary.	Screen writer, film director	
1971	Kodou	Feature, drama. Kodou, a young girl flaunts the traditions when she flees a lip tattooing ceremony. Her family is discredited and Kodou goes insane, preying on young children. When a European psychiatrist cannot cure Kodou, her parents subject her to a traditional exorcism session. Winner of the Prix Georges-Sadoul, France.	Screen writer, film director	100 m
1982	Jom ou L'Histoire d'un peuple (Jom or the History of a people)	Feature drama with an important role for the griot Khaly who exhorts striking workers. He explains them that the traditional Jom – a Wolof word for self esteem – is the source of all virtues. It includes the resistance to any oppression, be it by the enslaving colonizer or by the factory employer Mr. Diop.	Screen writer, film director, producer	80 m
