= Portal (computer) =

1980 portable microcomputer

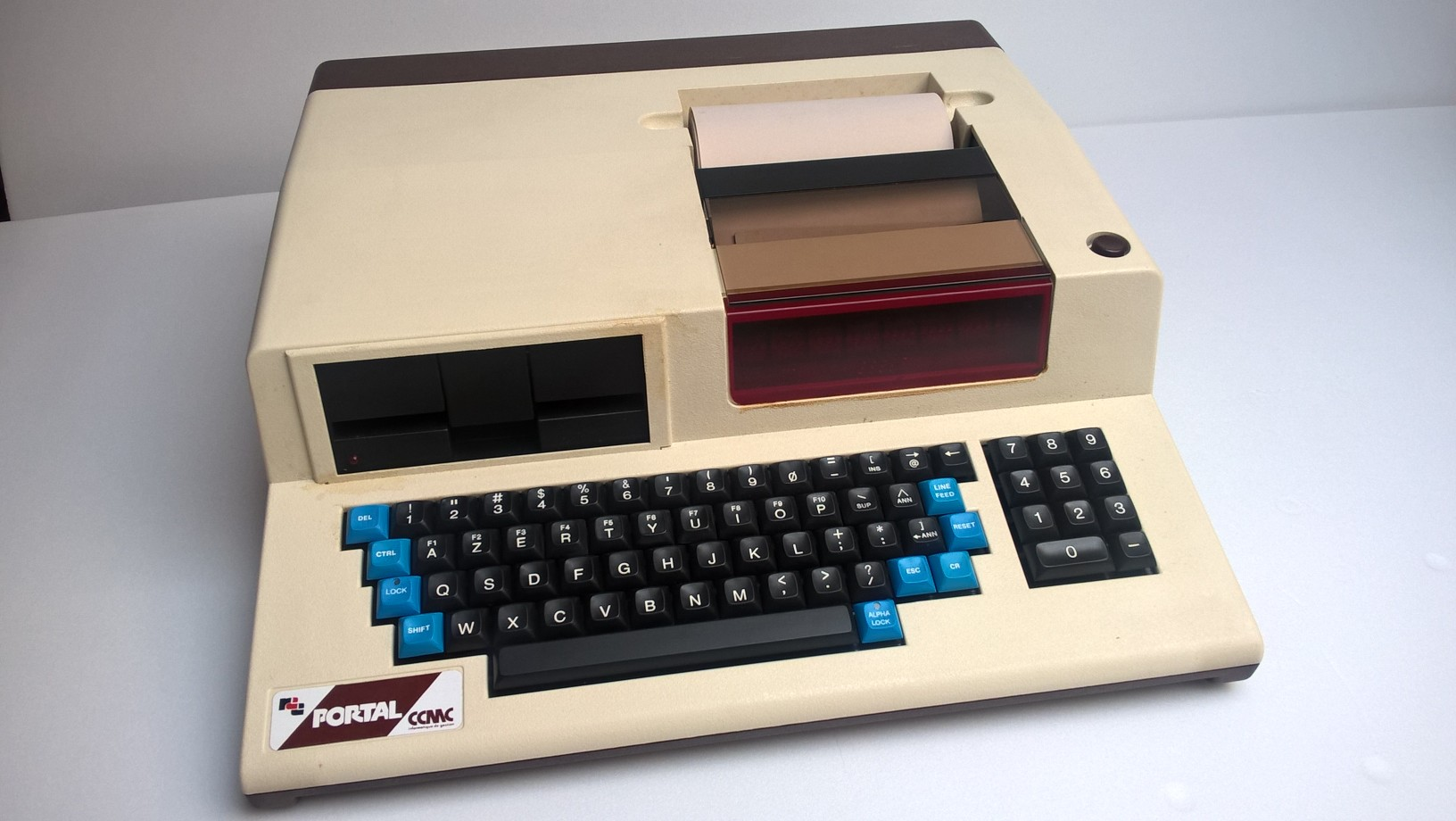
- Developer: François Gernelle
- Manufacturer: R2E Micral
- Type: Portable computer
- Released: September 1980; 46 years ago
- Discontinued: 1983; 43 years ago
- Units sold: Hundreds
- Operating system: Prologue (système d'exploitation), Basic Assembly Language (BAL)
- CPU: Intel 8085 @ 2 MHz
- Memory: 64 kB RAM
- Removable storage: Floppy disk
- Display: 32-character one-line screen
- Power: 220-volt
- Dimensions: 45 × 45 × 15 cm
- Weight: 12 kg

Portal R2E CCMC was a portable microcomputer designed and marketed by the Réalisation et Études électroniques department of the French firm R2E Micral, and officially appeared in September 1980 at the Sicob show in Paris. Osborne 1, the first commercially successful portable computer, was only released eight months later, on 3 April 1981.

The machine was designed with a focus on payroll and accounting. Several hundred Portal computers were sold between 1980 and 1983.

Surviving machines are extremely rare. No museum has a Portal, and only two are in private collections.

The company R2E Micral is also known to have designed "the earliest commercial, non-kit computer based on a microprocessor", the Micral N. One of these machines was sold for 62,000 euros to Paul G. Allen, the co-founder of Microsoft (with Bill Gates), by the auctioneer Rouillac on June 11, 2017, for Allen's Seattle museum, Living Computers: Museum + Labs.

== Specifications ==
The Portal was based on an Intel 8085 processor, 8-bit, clocked at 2 MHz.

It was equipped with 64 kB of main RAM, a keyboard with 58 alphanumeric keys and 11 numeric keys (in separate blocks), a LED 32-character one-line screen, a floppy disk (capacity - 140000 characters), a thermal printer (speed - 28 characters/second), an asynchronous channel, a synchronous channel, and a 220-volt power supply. The machine required access to mains power.

It came with two operating systems: Prologue and Basic Assembly Language (BAL).

Designed for an operating temperature of 15 °C to 35 °C, it weighed 12 kg and its dimensions were 45 × 45 × 15 cm.

== See also ==
- R2E Micral
- Laptop § History

== Bibliography ==
François Gernelle, Portal designer

== Sources ==
This article is derived partly from the page of old-computers.com and feb-patrimoine.com.
