= Micral =

Series of microcomputers produced by R2E

Micral is a series of microcomputers produced by the French company Réalisation d'Études Électroniques (R2E), beginning with the Micral N in early 1973. The Micral N was one of the first commercially available microprocessor-based computers.

In 1986, three judges at The Computer Museum, Boston – Apple II designer and Apple Inc. co-founder Steve Wozniak, early MITS employee and PC World publisher David Bunnell, and the museum's associate director and curator Oliver Strimpel – awarded the title of "first personal computer using a microprocessor" to the 1973 Micral. The Micral N was the earliest commercial, non-kit personal computer based on a microprocessor (in this case, the Intel 8008).

The Computer History Museum currently says that the Micral is one of the earliest commercial, non-kit personal computers. The 1971 Kenbak-1, invented before the first microprocessor, is considered to be the world's first "personal computer". That machine did not have a one-chip CPU but instead was based purely on small-scale integration TTL chips.

== Micral N ==
Micral N
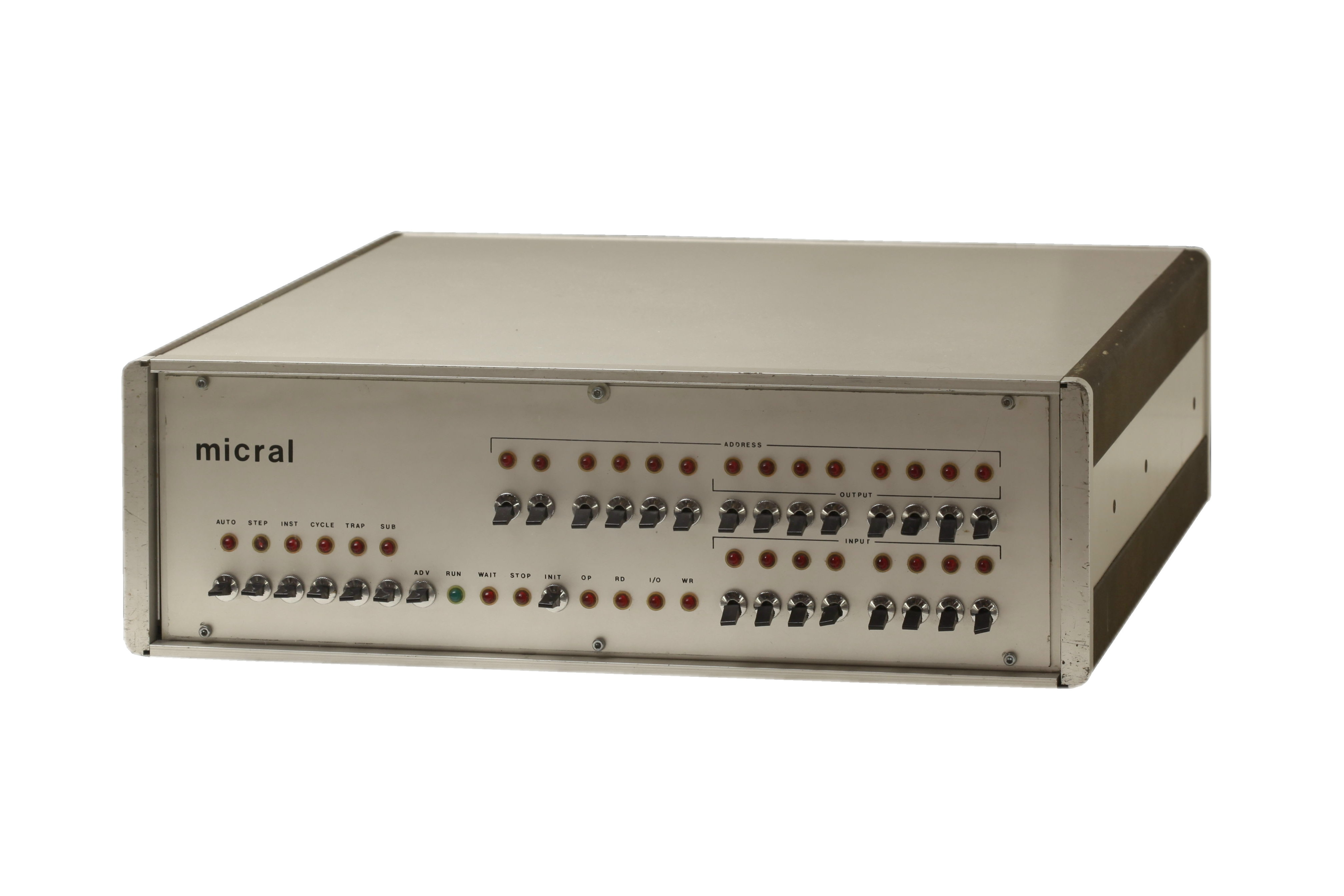
- Micral N
- Manufacturer: Réalisation d'Études Électroniques (R2E)
- Type: Microcomputer
- Released: February 1973
- Introductory price: FF 8,500
- CPU: Intel 8008 @ 500 kHz

R2E founder André Truong Trong Thi (EFREI degree, Paris), a French immigrant from Vietnam, asked Frenchman François Gernelle to develop the Micral N computer for the Institut National de la Recherche Agronomique (INRA), starting in June 1972. Alain Perrier of INRA was looking for a computer for process control in his crop evapotranspiration measurements. The software was developed by Benchetrit. Beckmann designed the I/O boards and controllers for peripheral magnetic storage. Lacombe was responsible for the memory system, I/O high speed channel, power supply and front panel. Gernelle invented the Micral N, which was much smaller than existing minicomputers. The January 1974 Users Manual called it "the first of a new generation of mini-computer whose principal feature is its very low cost," and said, "MICRAL's principal use is in process control. It does not aim to be an universal mini-computer."

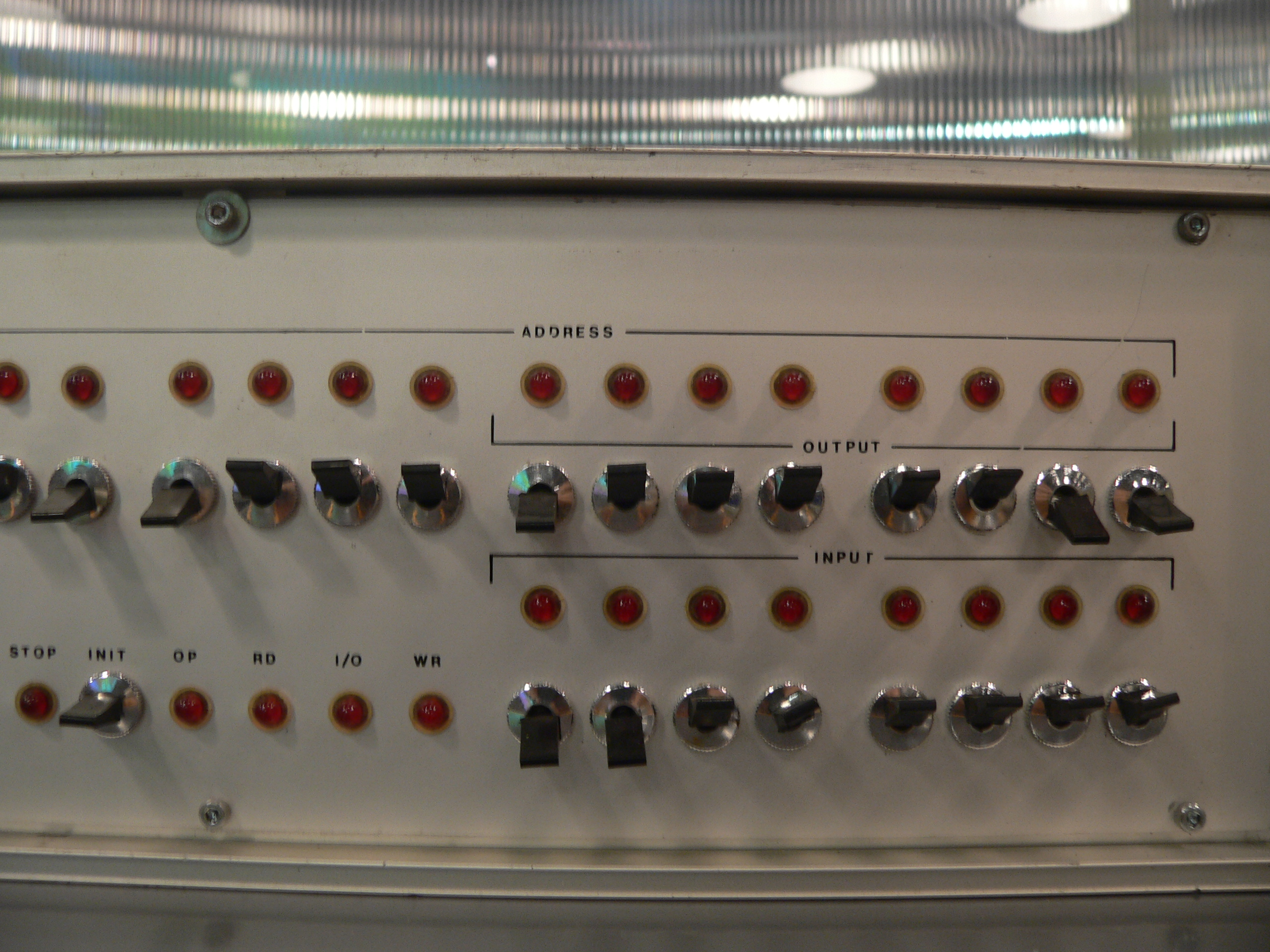
The front panel of a Micral N

The computer was to be delivered in December 1972, and Gernelle, Lacombe, Benchetrit and Beckmann had to work in a cellar in Châtenay-Malabry for 18 hours a day in order to deliver the computer in time. The software, the ROM-based MIC 01 monitor and the ASMIC 01 assembler, was written on an Intertechnique Multi-8 minicomputer using a cross assembler. The computer was based on an Intel 8008 microprocessor clocked at 500 kHz. It had a backplane bus, called the Pluribus with 74-pin connector. 14 boards could be plugged in a Pluribus. With two Pluribus, the Micral N could support up to 24 boards. The computer used MOS memory instead of core memory. The Micral N could support parallel and serial input/output. It had 8 levels of interrupt and a stack. The computer was programmed with punched tape, and used a teleprinter or modem for I/O. The front panel console was optional, offering customers the option of designing their own console to match a particular application. It was delivered to the INRA in January 1973, and commercialized in February 1973 for FF 8,500 (about $1,750) making it a cost-effective replacement for minicomputers which augured the era of the PC.

France had produced the first microcomputer. A year would pass before the first North American microcomputer, SCELBI, was advertised in the March 1974 issue of QST, an amateur radio magazine.

Indeed, INRA was originally planning to use PDP-8 computers for process control, but the Micral N could do the same for a fifth of the cost. An 8-inch floppy disk reader was added to the Micral in December 1973, following a command of the Commissariat à l'Energie Atomique. This was made possible by the pile-canal, a buffer that could accept one megabyte per second. In 1974, a keyboard and screen were fitted to the Micral computers. A hard disk (first made by CAELUS then by Diablo) became available in 1975. In 1979, the Micral 8031 D was equipped with a 5" 1/4 inches hard disk of 5 Megabytes made by Shugart.

== Later models ==
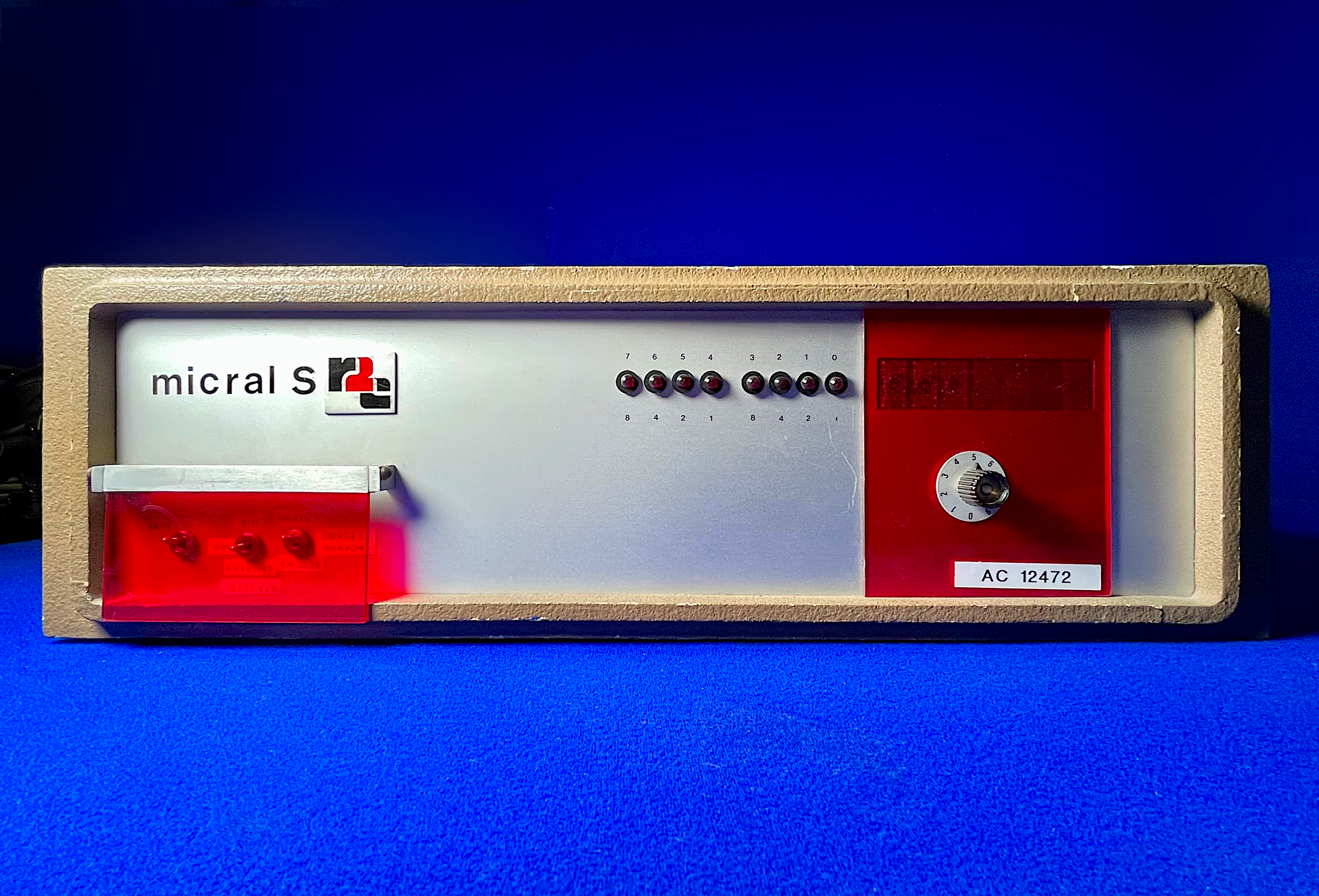
Micral S (1974)

Following the April 1974 introduction of the Intel 8080, R2E introduced the second and third Micral models, 8008-based at 1 MHz Micral G and 8080-based at 1 MHz Micral S.

In November 1975, R2E signed Warner & Swasey Company as the exclusive manufacturer and marketer of the Micral line in the United States and Canada. Warner & Swasey marketed its Micral-based system for industrial data processing applications such as engineering data analysis, accounting and inventory control. R2E and Warner & Swasey displayed the Micral M multiple microcomputer system at the June 1976 National Computer Conference. The Micral M consists of up to eight Micral S microcomputers, each with its own local memory and sharing the common memory so the local and common memory look like one monolithic memory for each processor. The system has a distributed multiprocessor operating system R2E said was based on sharing common resources and real-time task management.

Some time after the July 1976 introduction of the Zilog Z80, came the Z80-based Micral CZ. The 8080-based Micral C, an intelligent CRT terminal designed for word processing and automatic typesetting, was introduced in July 1977. It has two Shugart SA400 minifloppy drives and a panel of system control and sense switches below the minifloppy drives. Business application language (BAL) and FORTRAN are supported. By October, R2E had set up an American subsidiary, R2E of America, in Minneapolis. The Micral V Portable (1978) could run FORTRAN and assembler under the Sysmic operating system, or BAL. The original Sysmic operating system was renamed Prologue in 1978. Prologue was able to perform real-time multitasking, and was a multi-user system. R2E offered CP/M for the Micral C in 1979.

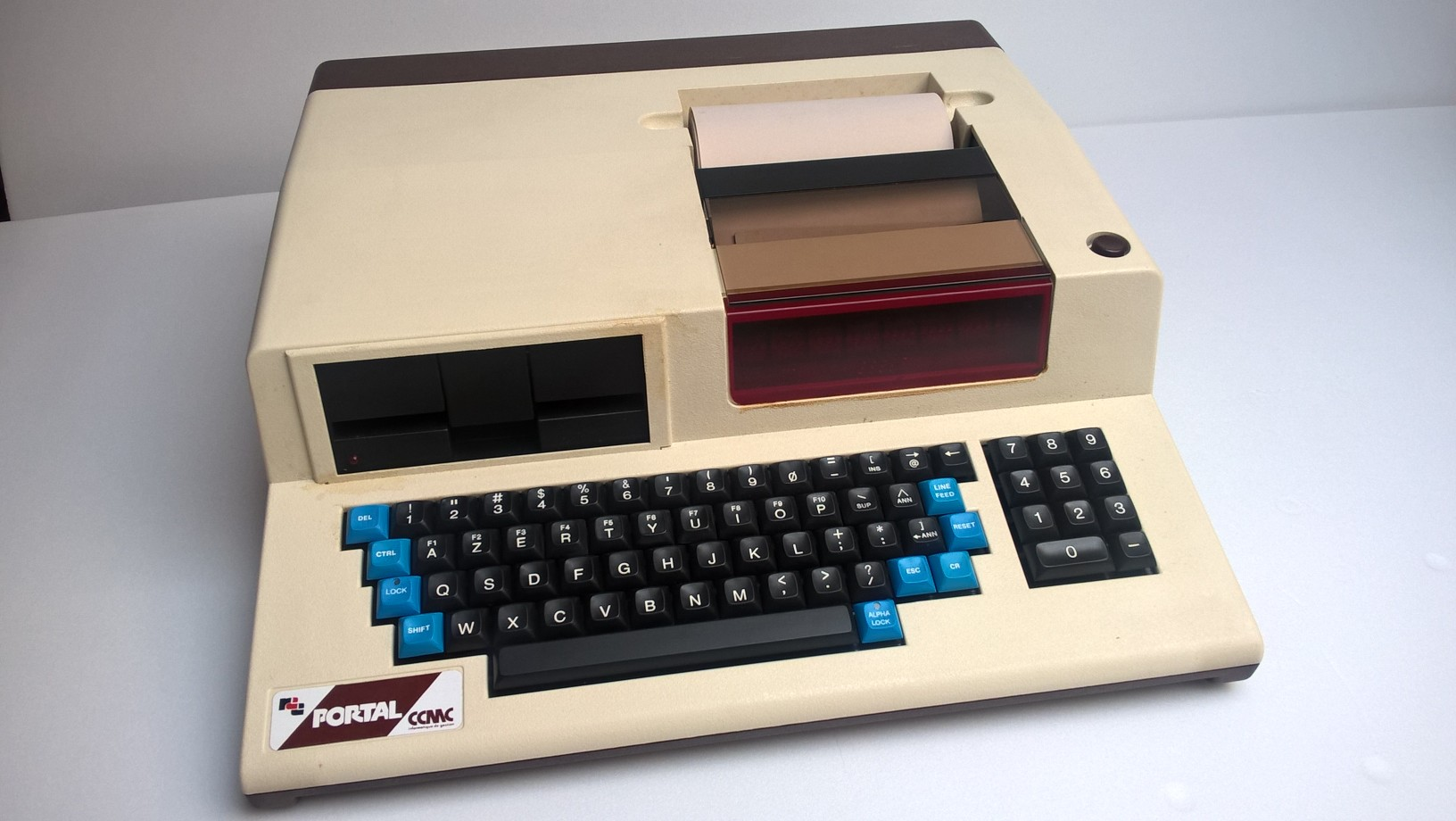
PORTAL (1980)

The R2E Micral CCMC Portal portable microcomputer made its official appearance in September 1980 at the SICOB show in Paris. It was designed and marketed by the studies and developments department of François Gernelle of the French firm R2E Micral at the request of the company CCMC specializing in payroll and accounting. The Portal was based on an Intel 8085 processor, 8-bit, clocked at 2 MHz. It weighed 12 kg (26 lb) and its dimensions were 45 cm x 45 cm x 15 cm, It provided total mobility. Its operating system was Prologue.

Later Micrals used the Intel 8088. The last Micral designed by François Gernelle was the 9020. In 1981, R2E was bought by Groupe Bull. Starting with the Bull Micral 30, which could use both Prologue and MS-DOS, Groupe Bull transformed the Micral computers into a line of PC compatibles. François Gernelle left Bull in 1983.

== Legacy ==
Truong's R2E sold about 90,000 units of the Micral that were mostly used in vertical applications such as highway toll booths and process control.

Litigation followed after Truong started claiming that he alone invented the first personal computer. The courts did not judge in favor of Truong, who was declared "the businessman, but not the inventor", giving in 1998 the sole claim as inventor of the first personal computer to Gernelle and the R2E engineering team.

In the mid-1970s, Philippe Kahn was a programmer for the Micral. Kahn later headed Borland which released Turbo Pascal and Sidekick in 1983.

Paul G. Allen, the co-founder of Microsoft with Bill Gates, bought a Micral N by the auctioneer Rouillac at the Artigny Castle in France, on June 11, 2017, for his Seattle museum Living Computers: Museum + Labs.

"Association MO5.com", a French preservation group, announced in 2023 that they had acquired a Micral N two years before in 2021. They are restoring it and documenting it.

== Micral computer models ==
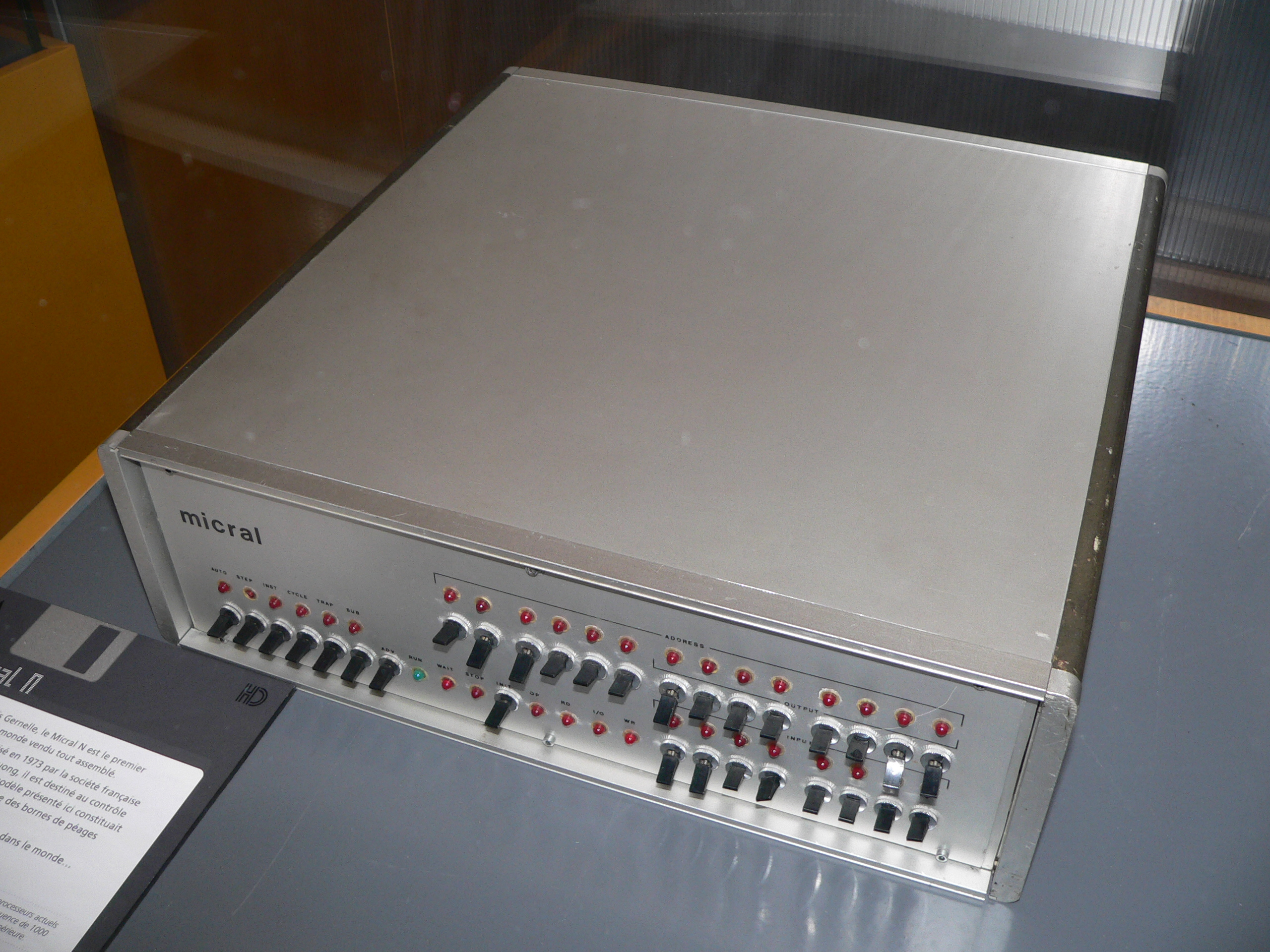
Micral N (1973)

=== R2E series ===
- 1973 : Micral N, first microcomputer, built by François Gernelle.
- 1974 : Micral G, Intel 8008 at 1 MHz, 16K RAM
- 1974 : Micral S, Intel 8080
- 1976 : Micral M, distributed system, Intel 8080 × 8
- 1977 : Micral C, Intel 8080, 24K RAM, integrated monitor, floppy disc drive
- 1978 : Micral V, Intel 8080, 32K RAM, portable

=== Bull series ===
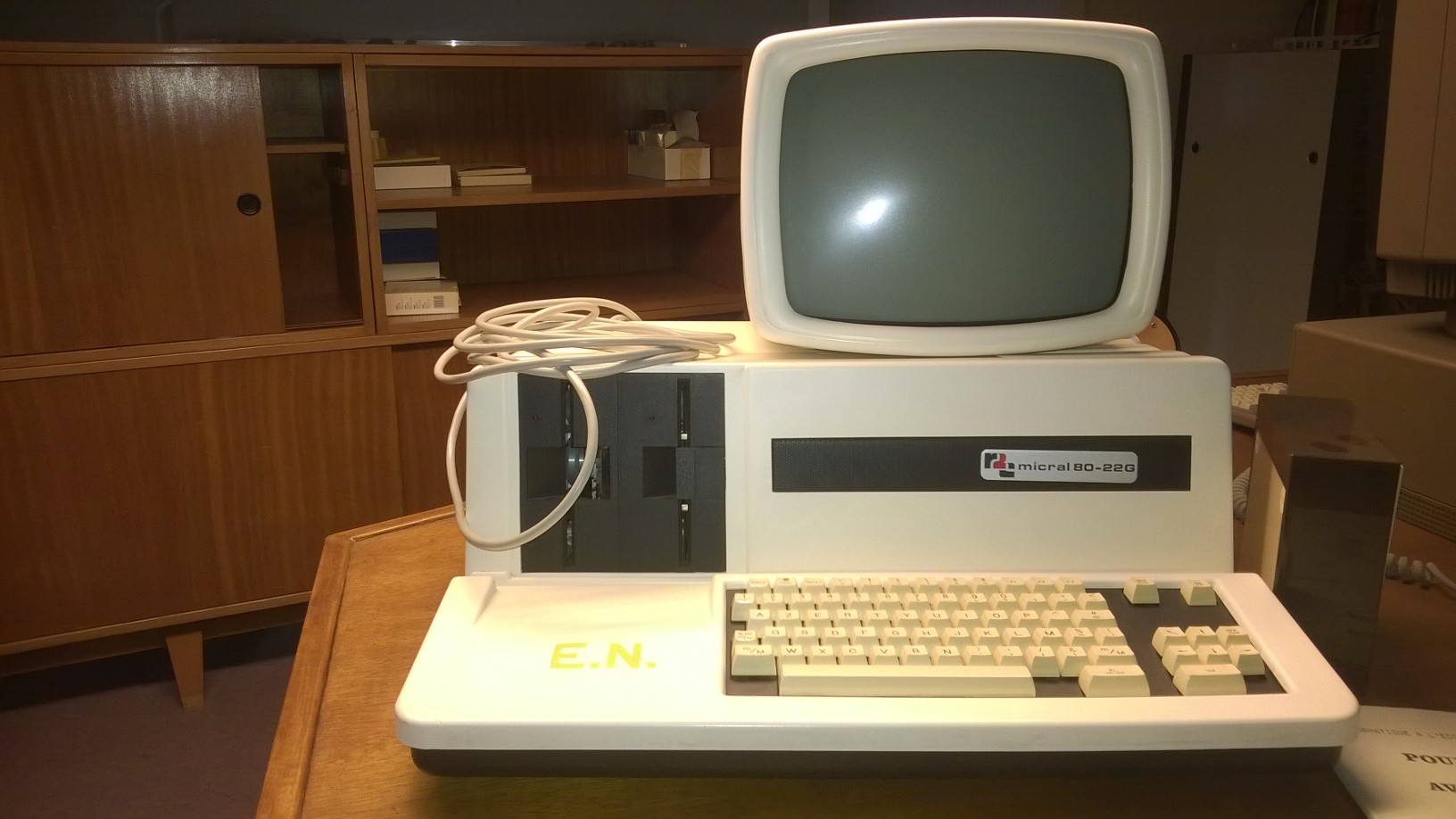
Micral 80-20 (1980)

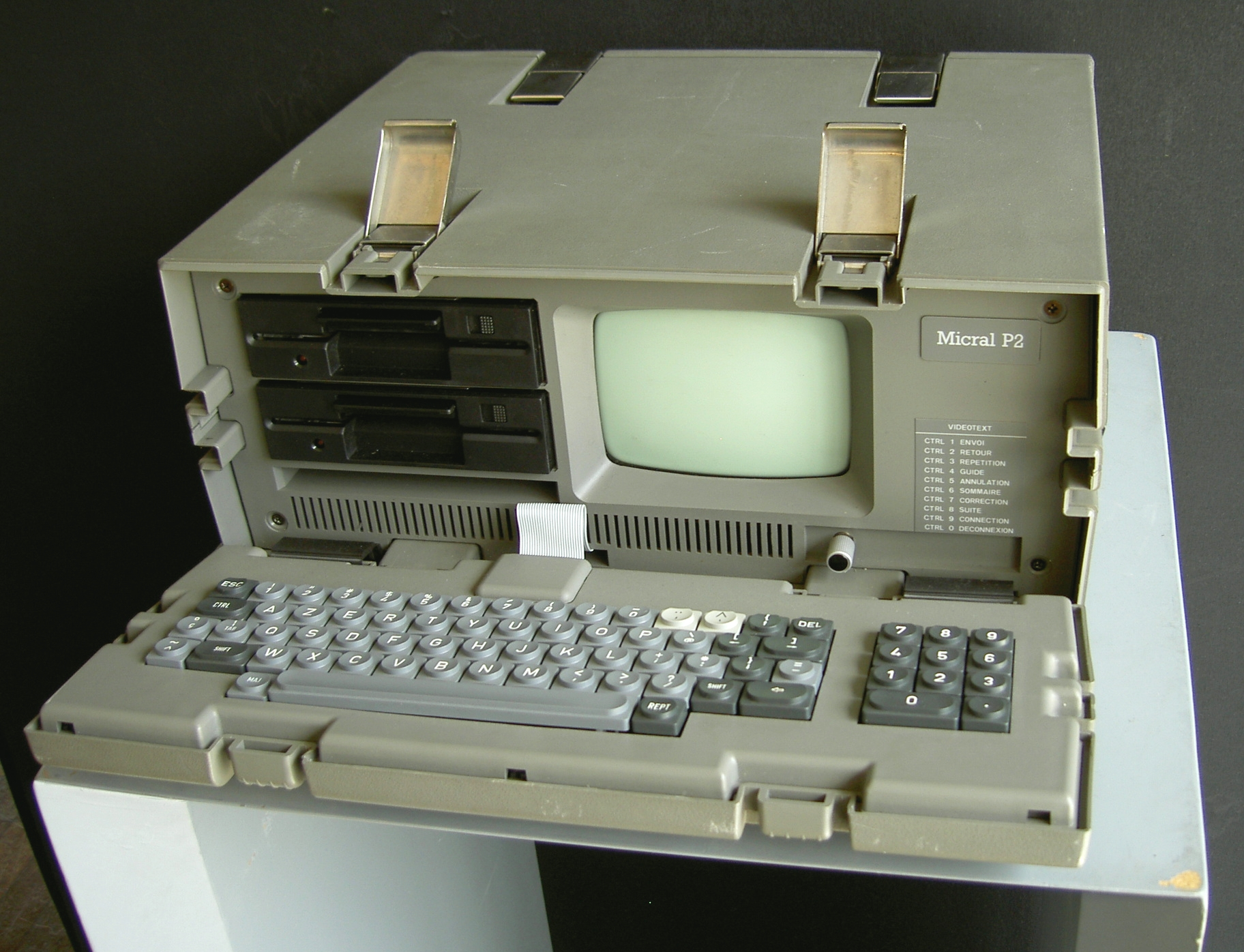
Micral P2 (1981)

- 1979 : Micral 80–30, Zilog Z80
- 1980 : Micral 80–20, Zilog Z80A at 3 MHz
- 1980 : Portal, Intel 8085 at 2 MHz
- 1981 : Micral P2, Zilog Z80 at 5 MHz, 64K RAM
- 1981 : Micral X, Zilog Z80, 10MB hard disc (CII Honeywell Bull D140)
- 1983 : Micral 90–20, Intel 8088 at 5 MHz
- 1983 : Micral 90–50, Intel 8086 at 8 MHz, 256K RAM

=== PC compatible series ===
- 1985 : Bull Micral 30, Intel 8088 at 4.77 MHz, PC-XT compatible (Nanoréseau network machine)
- 1986 : Bull Micral 60, Intel 80286 at 6 MHz, PC-AT compatible
- 1986 : Bull Micral 35, Intel 80286 at 8 MHz
- 1987 : Bull Micral 40, Intel 80286 at 8 MHz
- 1988 : Bull Micral 45, Intel 80286 at 12 MHz
- 1988 : Bull Micral 65, Intel 80286 at 12 MHz
- 1988 : Bull Micral 75, Intel 80386 at 16 MHz
- 1988 : Bull Micral Attaché, Intel 8086 at 9.54 MHz, portable
- 1989 : Bull Micral 200, Intel 80286 at 12 MHz
- 1989 : Bull Micral 600, Intel 80386 at 25 MHz
- Unknown year : Bull Micral 500, Intel 80386 at 20 MHz, Micro Channel bus

In 1989, Bull bought Zenith Data Systems, starting to release PC compatibles under the brand Zenith.

== See also ==
- History of computing hardware (1960s–present)
- History of personal computers
- Intellec
- List of early microcomputers
- Portal laptop computer
- Computing for All, a French government plan to introduce computers to the country's pupils
