= André Truong Trong Thi =

Vietnamese-French engineer

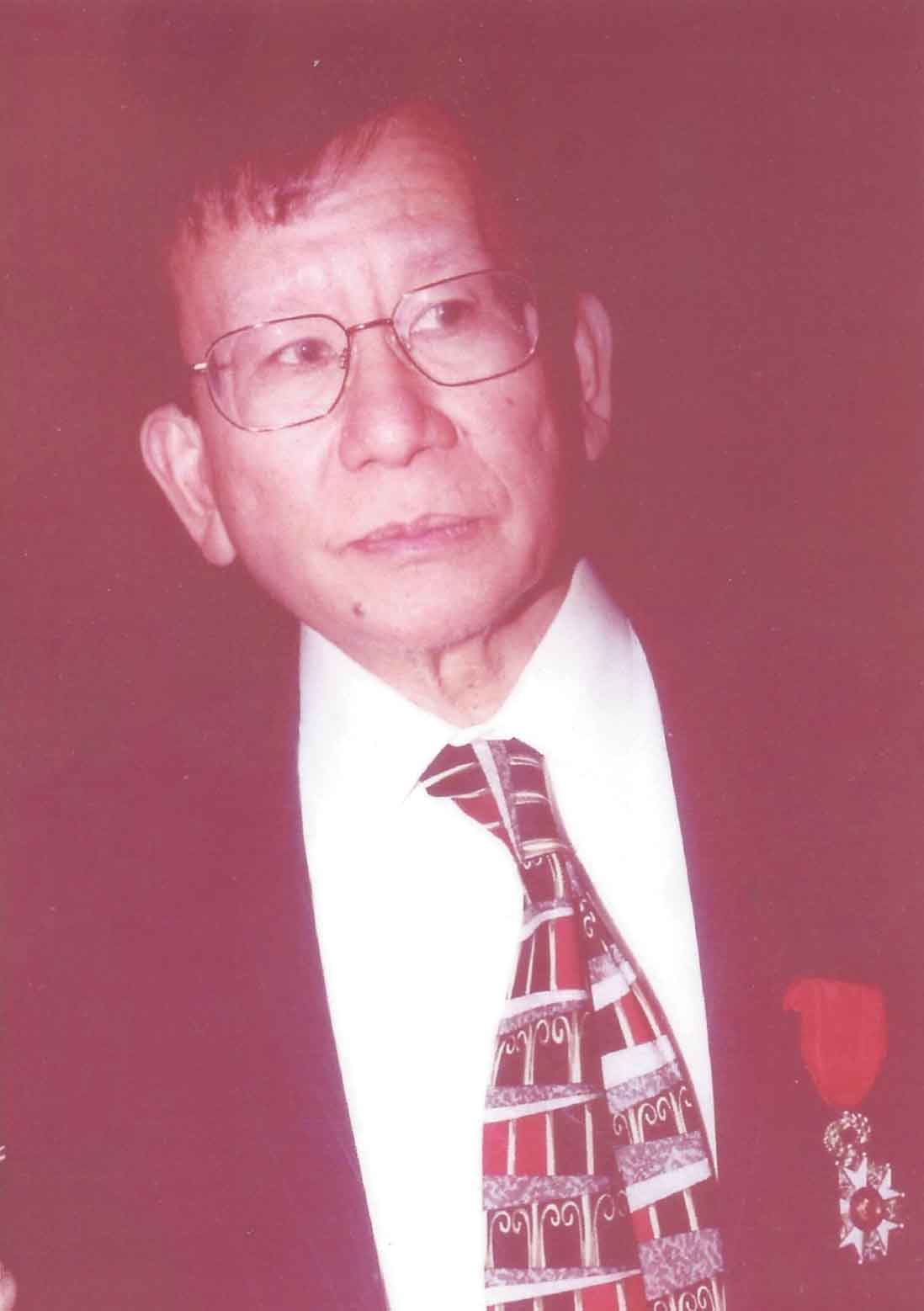
- Born: 30 January 1936; Cholon, Saigon, French Indochina
- Died: 29 April 2005 (aged 69); Paris, France
- Education: EFREI
- Known for: Invention of Micral N, first commercial PC
- Scientific career
- Fields: Electronic engineering Computer engineering

André Trương Trọng Thi (1936–2005) was a Vietnamese-French computer engineer. He is considered to be the "father of the personal computer" for his 1973 creation along with French inventor François Gernelle of the Micral N microcomputer based on an Intel 8008 processor, one of the world's first commercial microcomputers.

== Early life ==
Trương Trọng Thi was born in 1936 in Cholon (Saigon). When he was 14 years old, he arrived in France to study, and later studied at the École française de radioélectricité (now EFREI). After working for Schlumberger and Intertechnique for some time, he formed the company R2E (Réalisation d'Études Électroniques) in 1971.

In 1973, thanks to François Gernelle and a team of engineers, his company created the Micral, the first non-kit microprocessor-based personal computer in the world. It was created two years before the MITS Altair of Micro Instrumentation and Telemetry Systems arrived on the market. In 1981, R2E was absorbed by Groupe Bull.

The Micral computers were turned into a line of PC-compatibles in 1983. André Truong Trong Thi resigned from Bull, and joined the company Normerel formed by J. R. Tissot, a former member of R2E management. He developed the Oplite personal computer for Normerel. Normerel was in 1988 the third French computer maker after Groupe Bull and SMT Goupil.

In 1995, he formed APCT, a software company specializing in cryptography. In 1999, he was awarded the Légion d'honneur.

He died on April 4, 2005, in Paris after being hospitalized for two and a half years.

== See also ==
- List of pioneers in computer science
