= Microcomputer =

Small computer with a CPU made out of a microprocessor

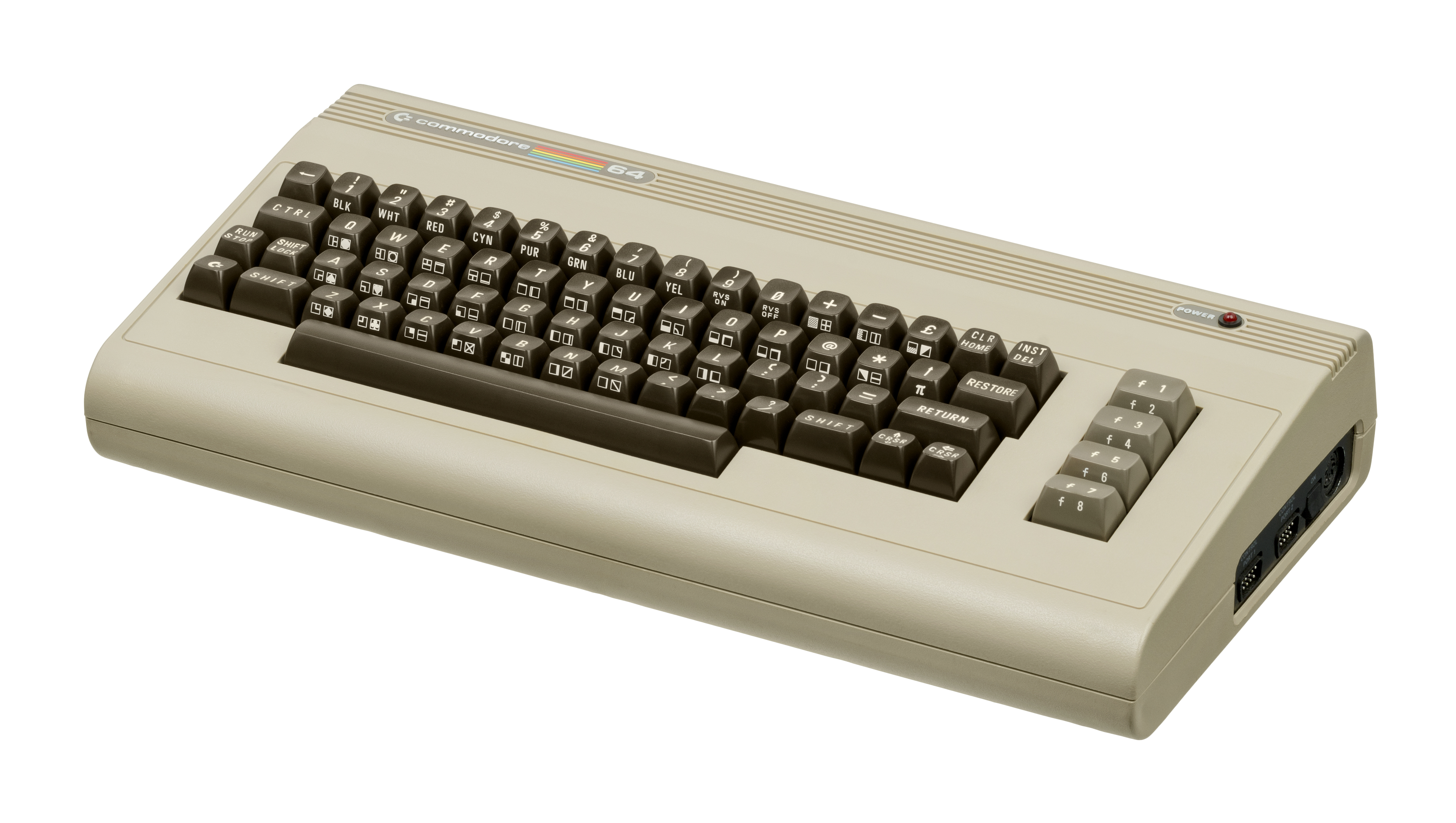
The Commodore 64 was one of the most popular microcomputers of its era, and is the best-selling model of home computers of all time.

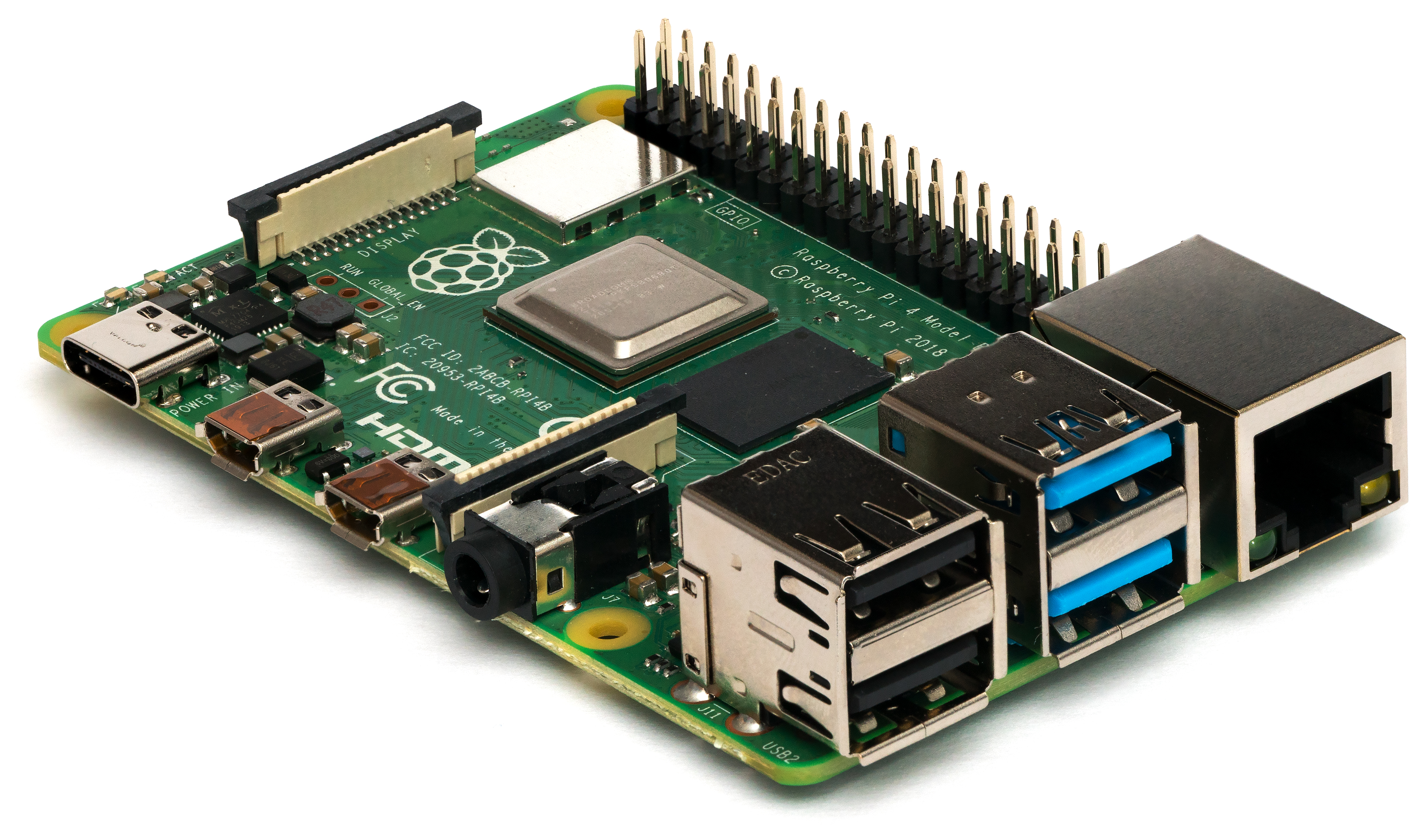
Raspberry Pi, a popular modern-class microcomputer

A microcomputer is a small, relatively inexpensive computer having a central processing unit (CPU) made out of a single integrated circuit microprocessor. The computer also includes memory and input/output (I/O) circuitry together mounted on a printed circuit board (PCB). Microcomputers became popular in the 1970s and 1980s with the advent of increasingly powerful microprocessors such as the MOS Technology 6502, Zilog Z80, and Intel 8088. The predecessors to these computers, mainframes and minicomputers, were comparatively much larger and more expensive.

Many microcomputers (when equipped with a keyboard or screen) are also commonly applied the term personal computers. An early use of the term "personal computer" in 1962 predates microprocessor-based designs. (See "Personal Computer: Computers at Companies" reference below). A "microcomputer" used as an embedded control system may have no human-readable input and output devices. "Personal computer" may be used generically or may denote an IBM PC compatible machine.

The abbreviation "micro" was common during the 1970s and 1980s, but has since fallen out of common usage.

== Origins ==
The term microcomputer came into popular use after the introduction of the minicomputer, although Isaac Asimov used the term in his short story "The Dying Night" as early as 1956 (published in The Magazine of Fantasy and Science Fiction in July that year). Most notably, the microcomputer replaced the many separate components that made up the minicomputer's CPU with one integrated microprocessor chip.

In 1973, the French Institut National de la Recherche Agronomique (INRA) was looking for a computer able to measure agricultural hygrometry. To answer this request, a team of French engineers of the computer technology company R2E, led by its Head of Development, François Gernelle, created the first available microprocessor-based microcomputer, the Micral N. The same year the company filed their patents with the term "Micro-ordinateur", a literal equivalent of "Microcomputer", to designate a solid state machine designed with a microprocessor.

In the US the earliest models such as the Altair 8800 were often sold as kits to be assembled by the user, and came with as little as 256 bytes of RAM, and no input/output devices other than indicator lights and switches, useful as a proof of concept to demonstrate what such a simple device could do. As microprocessors and semiconductor memory became less expensive, microcomputers grew cheaper and easier to use.

- Increasingly inexpensive logic chips such as the 7400 series allowed cheap dedicated circuitry for improved user interfaces such as keyboard input, instead of simply a row of switches to toggle bits one at a time.
- Use of audio cassettes for inexpensive data storage replaced manual re-entry of a program every time the device was powered on.
- Large cheap arrays of silicon logic gates in the form of read-only memory and EPROMs allowed utility programs and self-booting kernels to be stored within microcomputers. These stored programs could automatically load further more complex software from external storage devices without user intervention, to form an inexpensive turnkey system that does not require a computer expert to understand or to use the device.
- Random-access memory became cheap enough to afford dedicating approximately 1–2 kilobytes of memory to a video display controller frame buffer, for a 40x25 or 80x25 text display or blocky color graphics on a common household television. This replaced the slow, complex, and expensive teletypewriter (such as the popular Teletype Model 33) that was previously common as an interface to minicomputers and mainframes.

All these improvements in cost and usability resulted in an explosion in their popularity during the late 1970s and early 1980s. A large number of computer makers packaged microcomputers for use in small business applications. By 1979, many companies such as Cromemco, Processor Technology, IMSAI, North Star Computers, Southwest Technical Products Corporation, Ohio Scientific, Altos Computer Systems, Morrow Designs and others produced systems designed for resourceful end users or consulting firms to deliver business systems such as accounting, database management and word processing to small businesses. This allowed businesses unable to afford leasing of a minicomputer or time-sharing service the opportunity to automate business functions, without (usually) hiring a full-time staff to operate the computers. A representative system of this era would have used an S100 bus, an 8-bit processor such as an Intel 8080 or Zilog Z80, and either CP/M or MP/M operating system. The increasing availability and power of desktop computers for personal use attracted the attention of more software developers. As the industry matured, the market for personal computers standardized around IBM PC compatibles running MS-DOS, and later Windows. Modern desktop computers, video game consoles, laptops, tablet PCs, and many types of handheld devices, including mobile phones, pocket calculators, and industrial embedded systems, may all be considered examples of microcomputers according to the definition given above.

== Colloquial use of the term ==
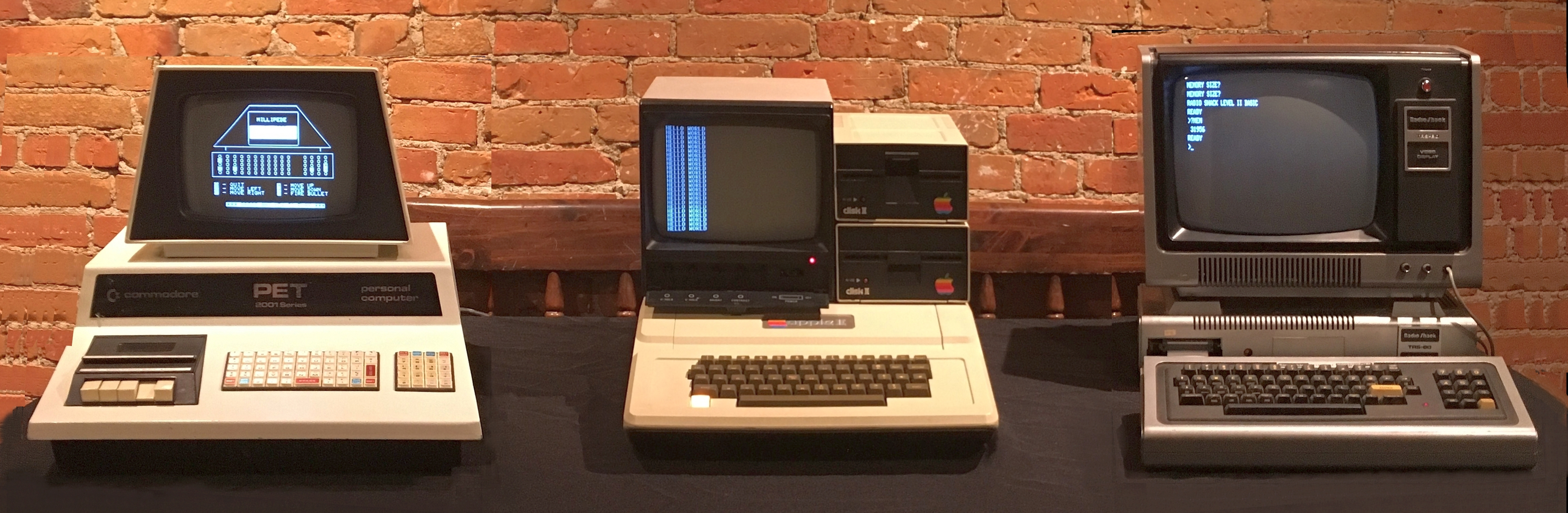
Three microcomputer systems frequently associated with the first wave of commercially successful 8-bit home computers: The Commodore PET 2001, the Apple II, and the TRS-80 Model 1

By the early 2000s, everyday use of the expression "microcomputer" (and in particular "micro") declined significantly from its peak in the mid-1980s. The term is most commonly associated with the most popular 8-bit home computers (such as the Apple II, ZX Spectrum, Commodore 64, BBC Micro, and TRS-80) and small-business CP/M-based microcomputers.

In colloquial usage, "microcomputer" has been largely supplanted by the term "personal computer" or "PC", which specifies a computer that has been designed to be used by one individual at a time, a term coined in 1959. IBM first promoted the term "personal computer" to differentiate the IBM PC from CP/M-based microcomputers likewise targeted at the small-business market, and also IBM's own mainframes and minicomputers. However, following its release, the IBM PC itself was widely imitated, as well as the term. The component parts were commonly available to producers and the BIOS was reverse engineered through cleanroom design techniques. IBM PC compatible "clones" became commonplace, and the terms "personal computer", and especially "PC", stuck with the general public, often specifically for a computer compatible with DOS (or nowadays Windows).

== Description ==
Monitors, keyboards and other devices for input and output may be integrated or separate. Computer memory in the form of RAM, and at least one other less volatile, memory storage device are usually combined with the CPU on a system bus in one unit. Other devices that make up a complete microcomputer system include batteries, a power supply unit, a keyboard and various input/output devices used to convey information to and from a human operator (printers, monitors, human interface devices). Microcomputers are designed to serve only one user at a time, although they can often be modified with software or hardware to concurrently serve more than one user. Microcomputers fit well on or under desks or tables, so that they are within easy access of users. Bigger computers like minicomputers, mainframes, and supercomputers, however, take up large cabinets or even dedicated rooms.

A microcomputer comes equipped with at least one type of data storage, usually RAM. Although some microcomputers (particularly early 8-bit home micros) perform tasks using RAM alone, some form of secondary storage is normally desirable. In the early days of home micros, this was often a data cassette deck (in many cases as an external unit). Later, secondary storage (particularly in the form of floppy disk and hard disk drives) were built into the microcomputer case.

== History ==
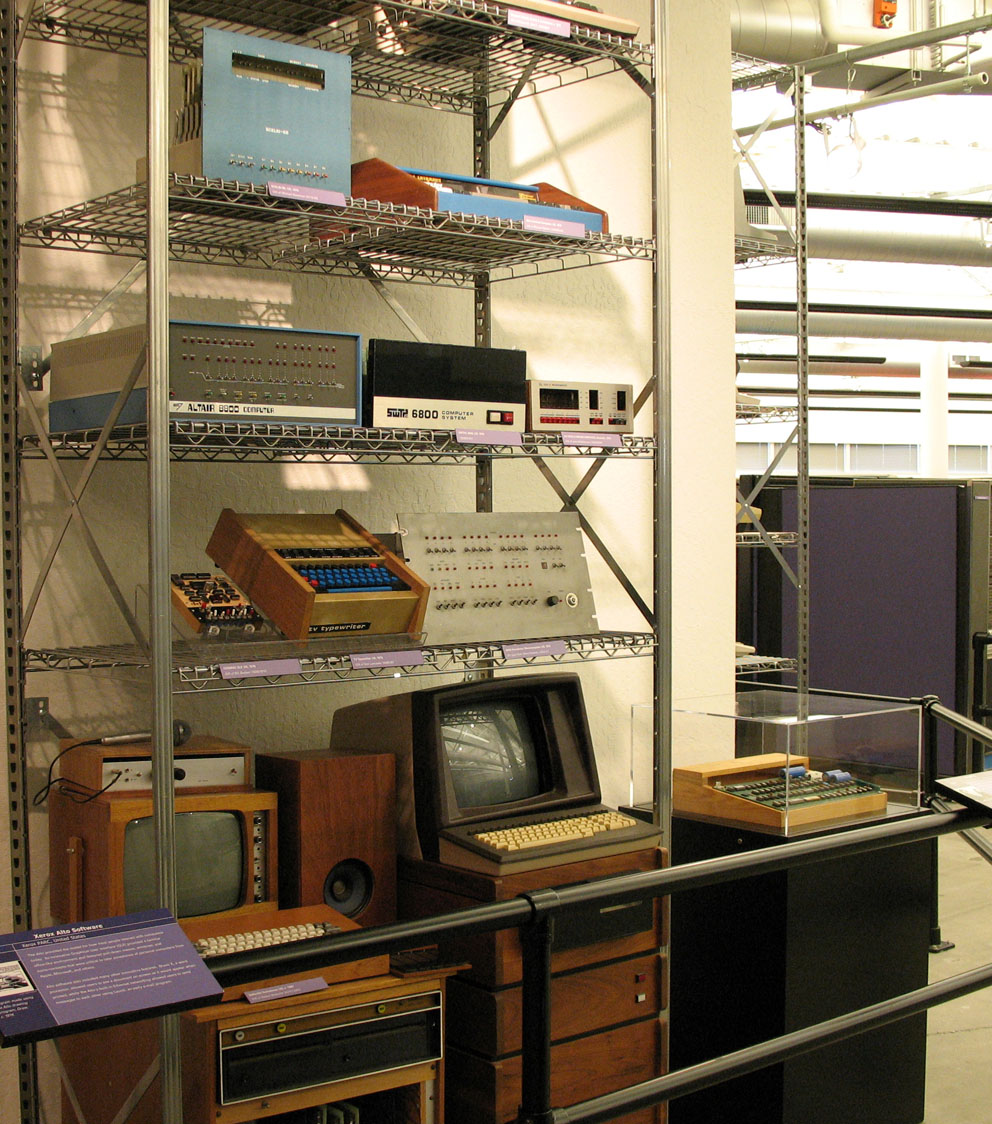
A collection of early microcomputers, including a Processor Technology SOL-20 (top shelf, right), an MITS Altair 8800 (second shelf, left), a TV Typewriter (third shelf, center), and an Apple I in the case at far right

=== TTL precursors ===
Although they did not contain any microprocessors, but were built around transistor–transistor logic (TTL), Hewlett-Packard calculators as far back as 1968 had various levels of programmability comparable to microcomputers. The HP 9100B (1968) had rudimentary conditional (if) statements, statement line numbers, jump statements (go to), registers that could be used as variables, and primitive subroutines. The programming language resembled assembly language in many ways. Later models incrementally added more features, including the BASIC programming language (HP 9830A in 1971). Some models had tape storage and small printers. However, displays were limited to one line at a time. The HP 9100A was referred to as a personal computer in an advertisement in a 1968 Science magazine, but that advertisement was quickly dropped. HP was reluctant to sell them as "computers" because the perception at that time was that a computer had to be big in size to be powerful, and thus decided to market them as calculators. Additionally, at that time, people were more likely to buy calculators than computers, and, purchasing agents also preferred the term "calculator" because purchasing a "computer" required additional layers of purchasing authority approvals.

The Datapoint 2200, made by CTC in 1970, was also comparable to microcomputers. While it contains no microprocessor, the instruction set of its custom TTL processor was the basis of the instruction set for the Intel 8008, and for practical purposes the system behaves approximately as if it contains an 8008. This is because Intel was the contractor in charge of developing the Datapoint's CPU, but ultimately CTC rejected the 8008 design because it needed 20 support chips.

Another early system, the Kenbak-1, was released in 1971. Like the Datapoint 2200, it used small-scale integrated transistor–transistor logic instead of a microprocessor. It was marketed as an educational and hobbyist tool, but it was not a commercial success; production ceased shortly after introduction.

=== Early microcomputers ===
In late 1972, a French team headed by François Gernelle within a small company, Réalisations & Etudes Electroniques (R2E), developed and patented a computer based on a microprocessor – the Intel 8008 8-bit microprocessor. This Micral-N was marketed in early 1973 as a "Micro-ordinateur" or microcomputer, mainly for scientific and process-control applications. About a hundred Micral-N were installed in the next two years, followed by a new version based on the Intel 8080. Meanwhile, another French team developed the Alvan, a small computer for office automation which found clients in banks and other sectors. The first version was based on LSI chips with an Intel 8008 as peripheral controller (keyboard, monitor and printer), before adopting the Zilog Z80 as main processor.

In early 1973, Sord Computer Corporation (now Toshiba Personal Computer System Corporation) completed the SMP80/08, which used the Intel 8008 microprocessor. The SMP80/08, however, did not have a commercial release. After the first general-purpose microprocessor, the Intel 8080, was announced in April 1974, Sord announced the SMP80/x, the first microcomputer to use the 8080, in May 1974.

Virtually all early microcomputers were essentially boxes with lights and switches; one had to read and understand binary numbers and machine language to program and use them (the Datapoint 2200 was a striking exception, bearing a modern design based on a monitor, keyboard, and tape and disk drives). Of the early "box of switches"-type microcomputers, the MITS Altair 8800 (1975) was arguably the most famous. Most of these simple, early microcomputers were sold as electronic kits—bags full of loose components which the buyer had to solder together before the system could be used.

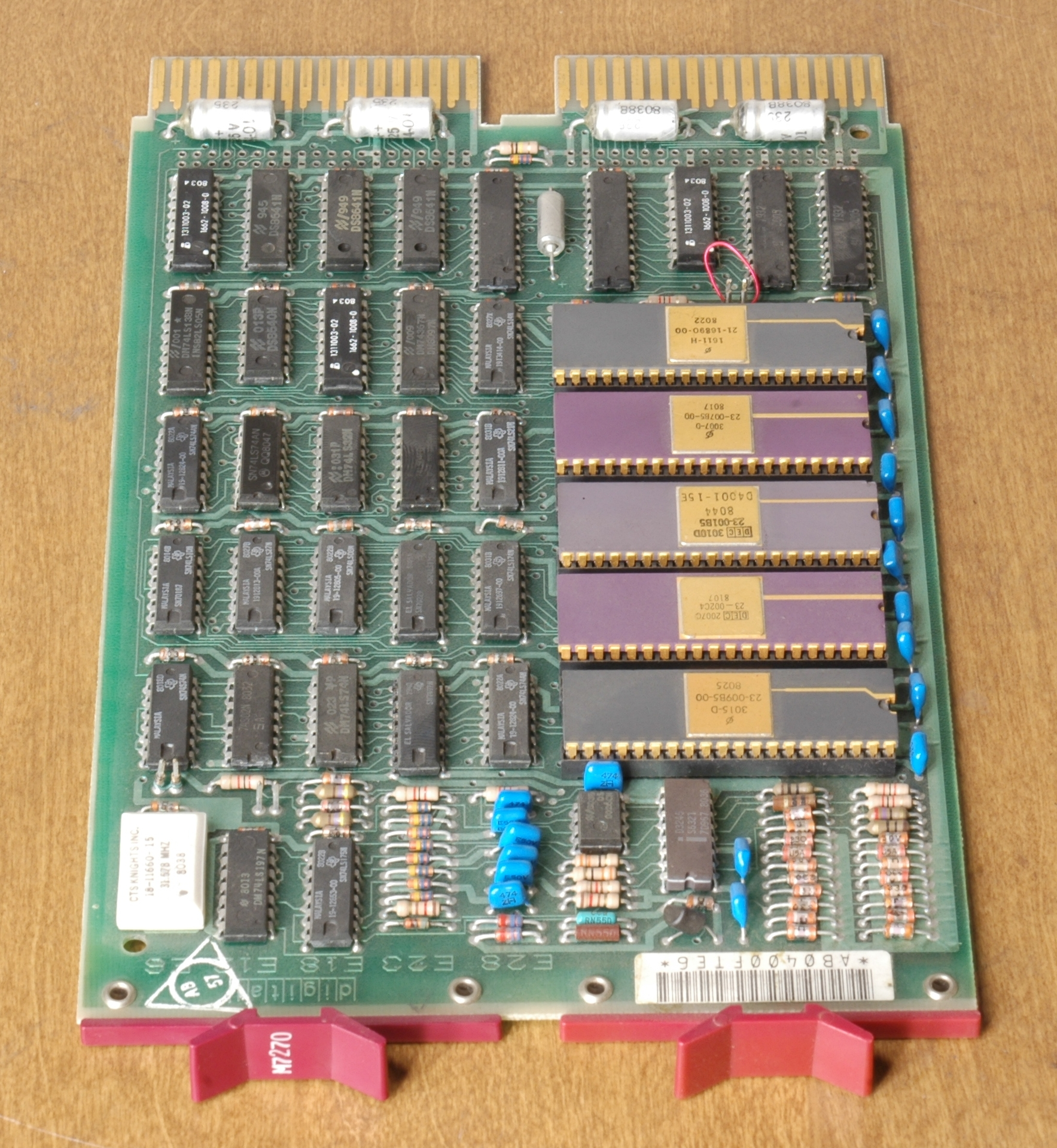
Microcomputer module LSI-11/2

The period from about 1971 to 1976 is sometimes called the first generation of microcomputers. Many companies such as DEC, National Semiconductor, Texas Instruments offered their microcomputers for use in terminal control, peripheral device interface control and industrial machine control. There were also machines for engineering development and hobbyist personal use. In 1975, the Processor Technology SOL-20 was designed, which consisted of one board which included all the parts of the computer system. The SOL-20 had built-in EPROM software which eliminated the need for rows of switches and lights. The MITS Altair just mentioned played an instrumental role in sparking significant hobbyist interest, which itself eventually led to the founding and success of many well-known personal computer hardware and software companies, such as Microsoft and Apple Computer. Although the Altair itself was only a mild commercial success, it helped spark a huge industry.

=== Home computers ===
By 1977, the introduction of the second microcomputer generation as consumer goods, known as home computers, made them considerably easier to use than their predecessors because their predecessors' operation often demanded thorough familiarity with practical electronics. The ability to connect to a monitor (screen) or TV set allowed visual manipulation of text and numbers. The BASIC language, which was easier to learn and use than raw machine language, became a standard feature. These features were already common in minicomputers, with which many hobbyists and early produces were familiar.

In 1979, the launch of the VisiCalc spreadsheet (initially for the Apple II) first turned the microcomputer from a hobby for computer enthusiasts into a business tool. After the 1981 release by IBM of its IBM PC, the term personal computer became generally used for microcomputers compatible with the IBM PC architecture (IBM PC–compatible).

== See also ==
- History of computing hardware (1960s–present)
- Lists of microcomputers
- Mainframe computer
- Market share of personal computer vendors
- Minicomputer
- Personal computer
- Keyboard computer
- SFF computer
- Supercomputer
- Workstation
