= Jom or the History of a people =

- Directed by: Ababacar Samb Makharam
- Release date: 1982
- Running time: 80 minutes
- Country: Senegal

Jom (or The History of a People) is a 1982 Senegalese color film by Ababacar Samb Makharam.

== Synopsis ==
Jom is described as the source of virtues such as dignity, courage, a certain beauty of gesture, loyalty to commitment, and respect for others and for oneself. The embodiment of African memory, Khaly the griot spans the ages to bear witness to the extent to which the Jom is at the root of resistance to oppression: a resistance that pits the colonizer against the enslaved people, the master against the servant, the factory owner against the workers.

== Plot ==
In a deprived neighborhood, Gramimina vents her anger on her painter husband, for he fails to cover the household expenses. Another woman kicks her husband out for the same motives. A man enters and sparks his wife's (Aminata Fall) fury because he spent the night outside the house.

During a meal, the griot Khaly says to a young audience, “My word is a maxim. It resembles an elastic band that stretches without snapping. It is an absolute and eternal truth.” As he addresses Madjeumbe, he shows him a photo of the head of a black person held at the end of a pick by a settler: “I question the past without ever answering”. As the images show a garden where women, adorned with bright colors, are on their way to a reception for the colony's commander, he states that everyone had two paths since the end of freedom. They either collaborate and maintain relations with the foreigner, or choose the path of refusal and preserve their jom.

The commander is found in a hut where Dieri, child of Queen Dior Fall, is waiting for him, seated cross-legged. Khaly offers him a white coat “each fiber of which is a part of our people,” as well as a pistol. The women greet Dieri and encourage him to defend their honor. The elders arrive and do as the women, pointing out that separation is the consequence of any union. Dieri, who confirms that “the time to leave is the time to die”, goes to the headquarters of the colonial rulers and climbs alone into the office of a commander who calls him a troublemaker. Dieri refuses to cooperate, opposing the officer who tries to restrain him. Hearing gunfire, his friend Sarithie rushes in and the two of them kill the French and Senegalese soldiers before fleeing. Dieri offers Sarithie his sword. The griot Khaly praises his accomplishment. As he is followed into a baobab forest by the French-subjugated Prince Canar Fall, Dieri prefers to stab himself rather than be taken prisoner.

Khaly says he defies death and transcends the ages, “as an eternal author, I take hold of History.” He is back in front of his dinner audience to affirm that his song is full of emotion and imagination.

Madjeumbe joins his father in his jewelry workshop and tells him how his boss divides the workers. His father urges him to maintain his solidarity and not give in. At a union meeting, the workers disagree over whether or not to go back to work. Madjeumbe calms them down and encourages them to return to work only if the dismissed workers are reinstated. The workers vote on continuing the strike. Khaly introduces Madjeumbe as Dieri's spiritual son.

In the neighborhood shown at the beginning of the film, a woman receives a letter for school fees. At school, the principal sympathizes with her difficulties. The factory manager, Mister Diop, offers the trade unionists a special raise, which infuriates Madjeumbe because the workers’ situation does not change. Their boss offers a trade unionist 4,000 French francs to encourage them to return to work. When the trade unionist arrives home, he offers some money to his wife and his mother, who refuse them, accusing him of treason. The manager goes to meet Madjeumbe's wife and gives her money “for the children”, but she becomes suspicious and refuses to accept it. He also goes to the workshop of Madjeumbe's father and gives him money to set his son straight. The father also returns the money.

In a posh villa, the patroness of the house berates and scorns a servant. Khaly visits her husband, who asks her to host a traditional party. “I was born a griot and I live by it”, Khaly replies, but “I only tell beautiful and majestic tales”. He then tells the story of a drought that pushes people to flee from the country to the city. We witness their migration and the animals dying of thirst. The griot warns them that they are about to face the most difficult challenge of all: man, their fellow human being. When they arrive in Saint-Louis in Senegal, Khaly encourages them to come and welcome the great dancer Koura Thiaw. The woman who hosts him also mistreats her servants. During her fiery performance before a large crowd in a street adorned with the French flag, the dancer urges her to “leave the maids of Walo in peace”, reminding her that domestic work does not mean slavery. Freeze frame: Khaly proclaims that Koura Thiaw “restores dignity to the humiliated, and since then her song of revolt has been on everyone's lips every time the sun rises”.

While the bribed unionist encourages the workers to go back to work, Madjeumbe objects, but the group splits in two. The women arrive, including Madjeumbe's wife and the wife of the corrupt unionist. Another unionist believes in going on strike but not preventing others from working. The women overpower him and chase away the strikebreakers. Khaly sings their praises in a final psalmody on the jom.

== Credits ==
- Director: Ababacar Samb Makharam
- Screenplay: Ababacar Samb Makharam, Babacar Sine
- Music: Lamine Konte
- Cinematography: Peter Chappell, Orlando Lopez
- Sound: Maguette Salla
- Editing: Alix Régis
- Production: Baobab Film (Senegal); ZDF Mainz (Germany)
- Original Language: wolof
- Format: color film — 35 mm panorama
- Genre: drama
- Duration: 80 minutes
- Release Date: 1982

== Cast ==
- Oumar Seck: Dieri Dior Ndella
- Lamine Amadou Camara : Madjeumbe
- Abou Camara : N'Dougoutte
- Zator Sarr : Mr Diop
- Fatou Samb Fall : Mrs Diop
- N'Deye Ami Fall : Mrs Sall
- Dumi Sene : Koura Thiaw
- Oumar Gueye : Khaly
- Makhouredia Gueye : Canar Fall
- Aimée Diallo : the wife of Dieri
- Charly : the governor
- M'Bayang Gaye : Madame Madjeumbe
- Isseu Niang: the sister of Dieri
- Kewe N'Diaye : a servant
- Fatou Fall : the second servant
- Deba N'Diaye : the third servant
- Jacques Maillard : the officer
- Madiodio Lam : the friend of Mrs Sall

== Production ==
It took the director two years of archival research in both Senegal and France to weave together the historical components of the script, written in collaboration with Senegalese sociologist Babacar Sine. The final version is the fourth. It was produced with a mixed team of Western and African technicians, and a cast of professional and amateur actors including Oumar Seck and Isseu Niang from Théâtre national Daniel Sorano in Dakar. The musical score is by the renowned Senegalese musician and composer Lamine Konte.

The budget of 60 million FCFA was partly financed by a loan from the Senegalese government. The production of the film took four years due to a chronic lack of funds, and the director found himself 50 million in debt.

In 1982, the film was screened out of competition at the Semaine de la critique of the Cannes Film Festival, and was screened at the Paris International Third World Film Festival, as well as at the Mogadishu Pan-African and Arab Film Festival (Mogpaafis).

== Reception ==
Some critics are bothered by the film's didactic aspect. Férid Boughedir went so far as to call it an “honorable failure”. Louis Marcorelles has a more positive opinion: “It deploys the tones and relationships of color and light with infinite gentleness, like a story that sketches and dawdles, without ever wanting to prove anything”. As for Paulo Antonio Paranagua, he praises the plastic beauty of Jom and the human warmth stemming from the griot and the lively, energetic female characters. An American critic went so far as to compare Jom to Brazilian cinema novo, as a “political-aesthetic manifesto”.

== Awards ==
- Prix du jury catholique international at the 8th FESPACO, 1983.
- Grand prix of the Festival du nouveau cinéma de Montréal, 1983.

== Analysis ==
Jom or the History of a people is one of the few Senegalese films to show social movements or protests. It is also one of the films in which the oral tradition breaks with realism. The first part of the film is based on the story of Dieri Dior Ndella, a legendary prince from the early twentieth century who had to kill a French colonial officer to save his honor. He is ambushed by Canar Fall, who also belongs to Senegal's feudal aristocracy.

Ababacar Samb Makharam mentions that he favored American shots and close-ups to establish a link between the characters and the viewers, without seeking to link them to nature as in most films of that era, while respecting the African rhythm in storytelling, dialogue and behavior. Likewise, he avoided field-contradiction.

== See also ==
- Cinema of Africa
- Cinema of Senegal
- List of African films
- List of Senegalese films
