= EFREI =

Private engineering school of Paris-Panthéon-Assas University

Coordinates: 48°47′23″N 2°21′50″E

EFREI, Paris-Panthéon-Assas University
- École d'ingénieur généraliste en informatique et technologies du numérique
- Motto: Vous êtes le futur du numérique
- Type: Grande école
- Established: 1936
- Parent institution: Paris-Panthéon-Assas University
- Chancellor: Frédéric Meunier
- Location: Villejuif, France
- Affiliations: CDEFI, CGE, UGEI
- Website: efrei.fr

The EFREI (École d'ingénieur généraliste en informatique et technologies du numérique) (Engineering School of Information and Digital Technologies) is the private engineering school of Paris-Panthéon-Assas University, located in Villejuif, Île-de-France, at the south of Paris.

Its courses, specializing in computer science and management, are taught with support from the state. Students who graduate earn an engineering degree accredited by the CTI (national commission for engineering degree accreditation) and the French government. The degree is equivalent to a master's degree in the European higher education area. Today, there are more than 6,500 EFREI graduates working in companies dealing with many different activities: education, human resources development, business/marketing, company management, legal advice and so on.

== History ==
EFREI was founded in 1936 as the École Française de Radioélectricité (EFR). The school's facilities were located at 10, Rue Amyot in the 5th arrondissement of Paris.

In 1945 an agreement with the government allowed students to receive financial assistance for the first time. In 1947 an engineering department was created and in 1957 the EFR qualification was certified by the commission for engineering qualifications. The teaching of computer science was introduced in 1969 and networking also became part of the syllabus. In 1987, a second site in Villejuif was opened; student numbers increased from 70 to 160. More extension projects have taken place since, and in September 2001, EFREI was moved, the entire campus being situated at 30, Avenue de la République, Villejuif. The faculty of Information Technology and Systems Management numbered more than 300 students for the first time.

In 2003 its curriculum was made compliant with the Bologna process and is now delivering a degree that is equivalent to a master's degree in the European higher education area. The same year the school stopped renting the building in Rue Amyot; all classes take now place at the Villejuif site. The college became briefly known as the College for Engineering, Information Technology and Business Studies but the name change was reversed in 2008.

== Notable alumni ==
EFREI's most notable alumnus is André Truong who created the Micral, the earliest commercial personal computer based on a microprocessor. In France, he is referred to as the father of the personal computer.

Pol Pot attended but failed his exams.

Alain Levinspuhl, former General Manager France, Spain & Belgium of BlackBerry graduated in 1973.

== See also ==
- Grandes écoles
