= Journal of Medicine =

- Discipline: Medicine
- Language: English
- Edited by: J.L. Ambrus

Publication details
- Former name(s): Medicina experimentalis
- History: 1970–2004
- Publisher: Karger Publishers
- Frequency: Bimonthly

Standard abbreviations
- ISO 4: J. Med.

Indexing
- CODEN: JNMDBO
- ISSN: 0025-7850
- OCLC no.: 01357589

Links
- Journal homepage

The Journal of Medicine was a medical journal that was published by Karger Publishers from 1970 to 2004. It continued the journal Medicina experimentalis that was published from 1959 to 1969. It published six issues per year. It was previously indexed by MEDLINE.
