= Journal of Microencapsulation =

- Discipline: Pharmacology
- Language: English
- Edited by: Oya Alpar

Publication details
- History: 1984-present
- Publisher: Informa
- Frequency: 8/year
- Impact factor: 2.287 (2019)

Standard abbreviations
- ISO 4: J. Microencapsul.

Indexing
- CODEN: JOMIEF
- ISSN: 0265-2048 (print); 1464-5246 (web)
- LCCN: 86655792
- OCLC no.: 643881980

Links
- Journal homepage; Online access; Online archive

The Journal of Microencapsulation is a peer-reviewed scientific journal that covers research on the preparation, properties, and uses of individually encapsulated novel small particles, as well as improvements to techniques using micro and nano particles in industrial, engineering, pharmaceutical, biotechnology, and research applications. It was established in 1984 and is published by Informa. The editor-in-chief is Oya Alpar (University of London). According to the Journal Citation Reports, the journal has a 2014 impact factor of 1.585.
