= ASD Semiconductor-Network Computer =

The ASD Semiconductor-Network Computer, also called the Molecular Electronic Computer, was a very early microminiaturized integrated-circuit based computer, demonstrated by Texas Instruments in October 1961 to show the use of ICs in a digital application.

== History ==
=== Molecular electronics ===
The term "molecular electronics", which nowadays seems odd, seems to originate ultimately from the physicist Arthur R. von Hippel. Presaging Feynman's later lecture "There's Plenty of Room at the Bottom" (1959), his 1956 paper, "Molecular Engineering", advocated for a bottom-up approach to engineering:

What is molecular engineering? It is a new mode of thinking about engineering problems. Instead of taking prefabricated materials and trying to devise engineering applications consistent with their macroscopic properties, one builds materials from their atoms and molecules for the purpose at hand.

This idea was agreeable to Westinghouse which, by 1957, had begun a "Molecular Systems Engineering" program. Similarly, by 1957, the Air Research and Development Command (ARDC) command of the USAF supported starting an R&D program in molecular electronics, by which they meant "a single piece of solid material synthesized to achieve a complete circuit function." After some discussions between Westinghouse and the USAF, the ARDC and the National Security Industrial Association (NSIA) had a joint conference on molecular electronics in 1958, in which C. H. Lewis gave a presentation titled "The Needs of the Air Force":

Instead of taking known materials which will perform explicit electronic functions, and reducing them in size, we should build materials which due to their inherent molecular structure will exhibit certain electronic property phenomena. ... We call this more exact process of constructing materials with predetermined electrical characteristics MOLECULAR ELECTRONICS.

Starting in April 1959 and continuing into 1960, the USAF funded Westinghouse with several million dollars to pursue its development program in molecular electronics. Westinghouse proposed a "dendritic" approach in which a multiply doped semiconductor structure was formed in a single operation, possibly directly from the melt. Westinghouse delivered eight devices to the USAF in 1960 as a result of this program, which, however, were generally not molecular electronic devices in the originally proposed sense. In practice, the term "molecular electronics" seems to have been applied somewhat loosely, perhaps because, in the words of Gene Strull, the USAF "really liked the term." Similarly, in 1959 and 1960, the USAF funded Texas Instruments to develop integrated circuits and to make a pilot production plant to produce monolithic planar ICs.. A report on the ASD Semiconductor-Network Computer explains that "The words 'semiconductor networks' are used by Texas Instruments to describe a genus of related products, whereas the terms 'functional electronic blocks' and 'molecular electronics' are frequently used by the Air Force." (Nowadays, many of these products would be called integrated circuits.)

=== The computer ===
As part of its integrated circuit development effort, the USAF funded TI to make a demonstration computer. This was the so-called Molecular Electronic Computer, also called the ASD Semiconductor-Network Computer. It was architected by Harvey Cragon and displayed by TI and the USAF in October 1961.

== Construction and architecture ==
The computer was quite small, weighing only 10 ounces and with a volume of 6.3 cubic inches, and consumed only 16 watts of power. It had split instruction and data memories; the instructions were 8 bits in length, consisting of a 4-bit opcode and a 4-bit address, and data words were 11 bits (10 bits plus sign.)

The computer was constructed from planar, monolithic silicon integrated circuits using triply-diffused junction transistors interconnected by vacuum-deposited aluminum. The chips were packaged in welded, hermetically sealed 10-lead packages using Kovar frames, leads and lid and ceramic bases, sealed with glass. Package dimensions were 0.250" by 0.125" by 0.035", exclusive of leads. Three kinds of ICs were used: R-S flip-flops, NOR gates, and drivers. The packaged ICs were assembled into stacks which were then welded together and encapsulated. The computer used a total of 47 stacks, containing a total of 587 packaged ICs.

Since the memory was also semiconductor, built out of flip-flops, given the low integration levels at the time, it was also quite small, having only 16 instruction words and 16 data words. A manual console expanded the computer with an additional 16 instruction words, and allowed the computer to be used as a desk calculator by means of running a 32-word program. Apart from the console, the computer had as peripherals a paper-tape punch and reader. It had a 200 kHz clock speed and used a bit-serial architecture.

The opcode was 4 bits, giving 15 instructions, as illustrated in the table. Memory addresses were also 4 bits and were relative: instruction addresses were relative to the current instruction, and operand addresses were relative to the current operand location. Addressing an operand had the effect of changing the current operand location to the new operand. Not all instructions contained an address.

Instruction set
Opcode	Address	Effect
ADD	n	Add operand n to accumulator
CAD	n	Load (clear and add) operand n to accumulator
SUB	n	Subtract operand n from accumulator
MUL	n	Multiply accumulator by operand n
DIV	n	Divide accumulator by operand n
STR	n	Store accumulator into operand n
JPN	m	Jump m instructions if negative
JPZ	m	Jump m instructions if zero
JPU	m	Jump m instructions always (unconditionally)
OAT		Output accumulator to tape
OATS		Output accumulator to tape and stop
OAKS		Output accumulator to console and stop
FAK		Input accumulator from console
LOM		Load operand and instruction memory from tape
SDN	n	Change current operand to n
