= François Gernelle =

French engineer and computer scientist

- Born: December 20, 1944 (age 81)
- Education: Conservatoire National des Arts et Métiers; Pierre Mendès-France University
- Occupations: Businessman; computer programmer
- Known for: Inventor of the first micro-computer using a micro-processor, the Micral
- Awards: Chevalier de l'Ordre national du mérite

François Gernelle (born December 20, 1944) is a French engineer, computer scientist and entrepreneur famous for inventing the first micro-computer using a micro-processor, the Micral N.

== Education ==
In the late 1960s, Gernelle earned an engineering degree at the Conservatoire National des Arts et Métiers. In 1978, he earned a Ph.D. in computer science at the Pierre Mendès-France University of Grenoble.

== Career ==
=== Intertechnique and R2E ===
In 1968, he was hired by Intertechnique, a company specialized in electronic measurement for aviation. There he discovered the Intel 8008 microprocessor and imagined all its potential applications. As his hierarchy didn't share his views on the i8008 development capacity, he resigned in 1972 and joined R2E, a company created and led by Paul Magneron. He designed the Micral N micro-computer to answer a request of INRA to measure agricultural hygrometry. During this project, he was granted two patents. In 1973 he supported the Micral N and, with the company's growth, helped to design 20 other multi-user microcomputers for some were multi-processor one.

=== Bull Micral ===
In 1981, the Bull company acquired R2E and he then joined the new entity Bull Micral. But the company wanted him to design IBM PC compatible machines and François Gernelle didn't agree because he thought this machine was poorly designed, using an 8 bit single-tasking single-user i8088 powered by a poor operating system. In his mind, this kind of poor computer design was a dead-end at a time where really good micro-processors existed and offered capacity to design powerful multi-user and multi-tasking systems at medium and even low cost.

=== FORUM International ===
In 1983, he resigned from Bull and founded a new company named FORUM International to create professional computers powered by Prologue OS.

== See also ==
- List of pioneers in computer science

== External References ==
- This article is based on the French Wikipedia article.
- (in French) Interview with F. Gernelle issued in Le Choc du Mois issue #18 of december 2007.
- (in French) «La naissance du premier micro-ordinateur: le Micral N» ("Birth of the first micro-computer: the Micral N") article written by F.Gernelle where he talks about his career at R2E, Bull and the creation of FORUM International.
- Ryan, Dan (2011). History of Computer Graphics: Dlr Associates Series. Author House. ISBN 978-1-4567-5115-9.
