= Conservatoire national des arts et métiers =

French engineering school founded in 1794

Coordinates: 48°52′1″N 2°21′16″E

French National Conservatory of Arts and Crafts
- Conservatoire national des arts et métiers
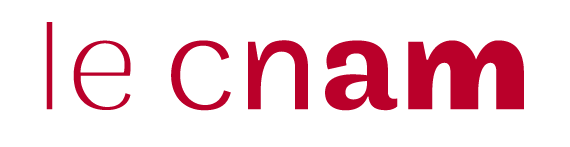
- Motto: Docet omnes ubique (Latin)
- Motto in English: Teaching to everyone everywhere
- Type: Public, grand établissement, grande école
- Established: 1794
- Accreditation: Grande école, Commission des titres d'ingénieur, AMBA, EduQua
- Affiliations: Paris-Saclay University, AMBA, CGE, Grand Etablissement, Consortium Couperin, Commission des Titres d'Ingénieur, EduQua, Elles Bougent, Hautes Écoles Sorbonne Arts et Métiers University, Répertoire national des certifications professionnelles
- Budget: 174 M€ in 2020
- President: Florence Parly
- Vice-Chancellor: Bénédicte Fauvarque-Cosson
- Academic staff: 1,670: 568 Professors-Researchers | 1,102 academic staff
- Students: 70,000 (57.7% employees, 24% job seekers, 12% students, 6.3% self-employed) | 10% of foreign students
- Postgraduates: 1,592 (grande école engineers enrollment)
- Doctoral students: 91 (enrolled at the EiCNAM grande école engineering school) | 340 in total
- Location: Headquartered in Paris, France; campuses in Paris (36% of students), in 160 other French cities, in overseas France (3% of students), campuses in whole francophone Africa and in other countries (11% of students)
- Campus: Urban
- Language: French, English
- Website: www.cnam.fr

The Conservatoire national des arts et métiers (French pronunciation: [kɔ̃sɛʁvatwaʁ nɑsjɔnal dez‿aʁ e metje]; transl. "National Conservatory of Arts and Crafts"; abbr. CNAM) is an AMBA-accredited, public grande école and grand établissement of France. It is a member of the Conférence des Grandes écoles, (Note: In France, the Conférence des Grandes écoles (CGE) is analogous to the Ivy League in the US, Oxbridge in the UK, the C9 League in China, or the Imperial Universities in Japan.) and was one of the founding schools of the grande école system in 1794, along with the École polytechnique and École normale supérieure.

Despite its literal English translation, the term arts et métiers more accurately refers to the ‘practical’ arts and the study of industrial skills, techniques and design. The CNAM has historically been focused on areas of applied science and engineering, rather than the decorative or fine arts.

Headquartered in Paris, CNAM has campuses in every major French city, in overseas France and in every francophone African country, China, Haiti, Germany, and Switzerland. Founded in 1794 by the French bishop Henri Grégoire, CNAM's core mission is dedicated to provide education and conduct research for the promotion of science and industry. With 70,000 students and a budget of €174 million, it is the largest university in Europe in terms of Budget for distance learning and continued education, and in terms of enrolment, slightly ahead of the University of Hagen.

Under the aegis of the French Ministry of National Education, the National Directory of Professional Certifications and the Accreditation authority for French professional engineers, CNAM provides Grande Ecole and non-Grande Ecole certificates, diplomas, Bachelor's degrees, Master's degrees and PhD's in Science, Engineering, Law, Management (AMBA-accredited), Finance, Accountancy, Urban planning and Humanities, all designed to abide by the European Bologna Process, and thus complying with the European Credit Transfer System. It is the only higher education institution in Europe to provide Physics, Chemistry and Life-Science engineer's degrees up to a PhD-level (some of which 100% remotely) via distance learning and via its so-called "hybrid learning" which includes intermittent laboratories classes concentrated during a whole week on-site.

The CNAM also hosts a museum dedicated to scientific and industrial inventions called the Musée des Arts et Métiers (English: the Industrial Design Museum), which welcomed 250,000 visitors in 2018. The museum is located on the Parisian campus of CNAM at 292 rue Saint Martin, in the 3rd arrondissement of Paris, in the historic quarter of the Marais.

== History ==
Founded on 10 October 1794, during the French Revolution, it was then proposed by Abbé Henri Grégoire as a "depository for machines, models, tools, drawings, descriptions and books in all the areas of the arts and trades". The deserted Saint-Martin-des-Champs Priory (and particularly its Gothic refectory by Pierre de Montereau) was selected as the site of collection, which officially opened in 1802.

Tennis Court Oath (1789) by David : the abbot Henri Grégoire, was a founding member of the French Conservatory of Arts and Crafts, and is shown here wearing his clergy black cloth, in the foreground, at the centre of the painting with Dom Gerle on the left and Jean-Paul Rabaut Saint-Étienne on the right-hand side.

Originally charged with the collection of inventions, it has since become an educational institution. At the present time, it is known primarily as a grand-école and university for:

- adults seeking higher education as engineering (multidisciplinary scientific program), master and bachelor's degrees, mostly through evening and/or remote classes in a variety of topics;
- young students enrolling in training diplomas in apprenticeship;
- international student of bachelors and masters taught in English.

The collection of inventions is now operated by the Musée des Arts et Métiers. The original Foucault pendulum was exhibited as part of the collection, but was moved to the Panthéon in 1995 during museum renovation. It was later reinstalled in the Musée des Arts et Métiers. On 6 April 2010, the cable suspending the original pendulum bob snapped causing irreparable damage to the pendulum and to the marble flooring of the museum.

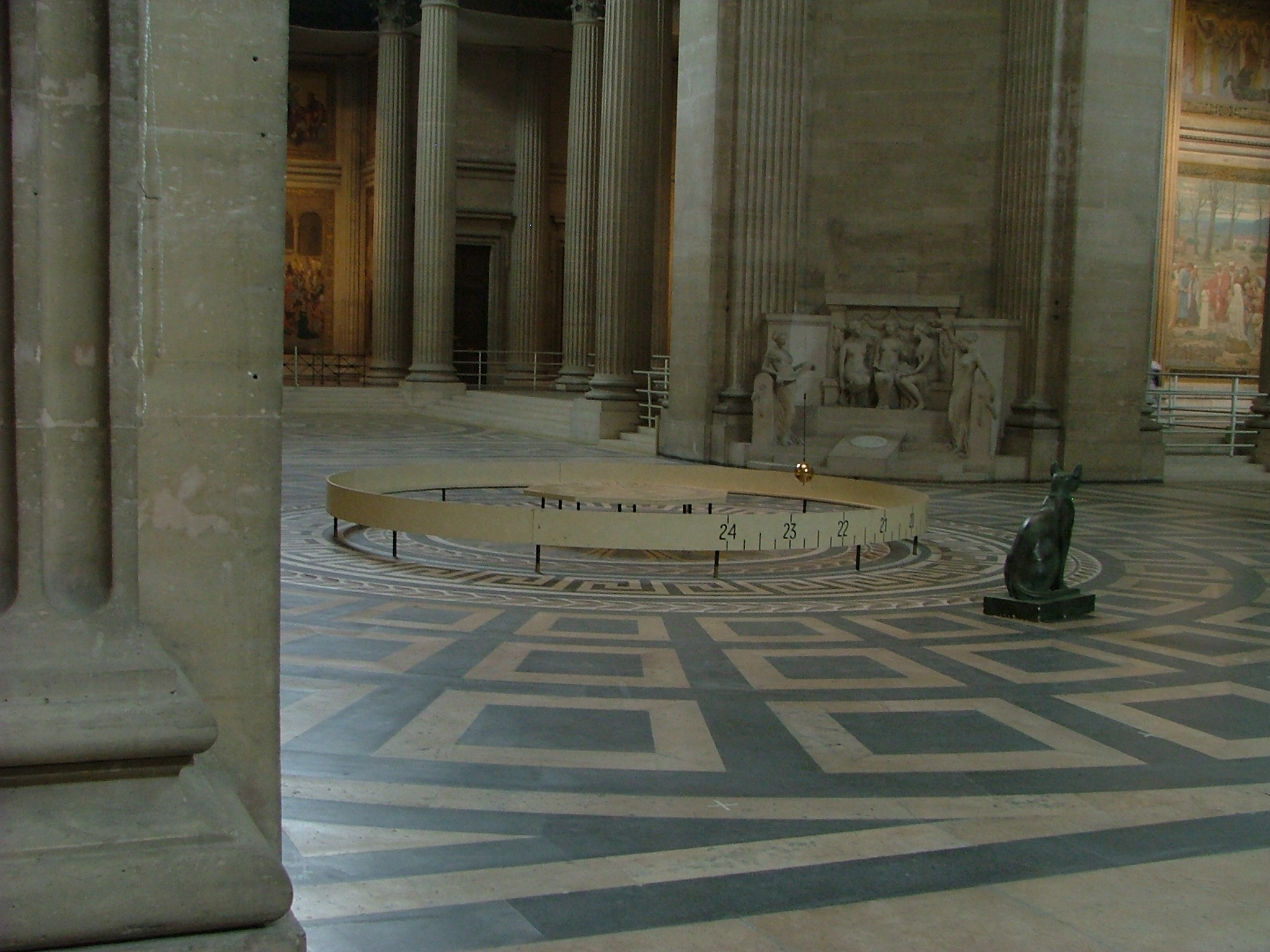
For the first time in history, in 1851, the French physicist Léon Foucault used a pendulum in order to prove the rotation of Earth around its own axis. The pendulum is exhibited at the Museum of Cnam on the Parisian campus and at the Panthéon.

The novel Foucault's Pendulum written by Umberto Eco deals greatly with this establishment, as the Foucault pendulum hung in the museum plays a great role in the storyline. The novel was published in 1988 prior to the pendulum being moved back to the Panthéon during the museum reconstruction.

On 25 November 1819, at the instigation of Duke Decazes, newly nominated as Minister of the Interior, a three-Chairs higher education is established at the French National Conservatory of Arts and Crafts: Applied Mechanical Engineering vested in Baron Charles Dupin; Applied Chemistry entrusted to Nicolas Clément; and Industrial Economics left with Jean Baptiste Say.

In June 2026, the conservatory entered the QS rankings, ranked 515 worldwide.

== Missions and values ==
The French National Conservatory of Arts and Crafts is infused with the values of the Lumières, as part of the French enlightenment era, of the 18th Century French Humanism, and of the French encyclopedists, whose goal was to provide emancipation via knowledge for everyone; the latter being often followed by most Grande Ecole and Universities in France, along with Universalism and Cartesianism. This background paved the way to nowadays CNAM's values of meritocracy, solidarity and academic excellence.

Under the supervision of the Ministry of Higher Education and as French public institution of higher education, it is assigned three missions:

- Training throughout life (Lifelong learning);
- Technological research and innovation;
- Dissemination of scientific and technical culture.

These missions and values are reflected in CNAM's motto: "Omnes docet ubique", which means: "Teaching to everyone everywhere."

== Campuses ==
=== Parisian campus ===
Out of the 70,000 students enrolled at CNAM (57.7% employees, 24% job seekers, 12% students, 6.3% self-employed), 36% are enrolled at the Parisian campus, 3% in Overseas France, 11% abroad and the rest in metropolitan France, of which 1,592 are enrolled at the Grande Ecole engineer school of CNAM: the EiCNAM. The Parisian campus and headquarters of the French National Conservatory of Arts and Crafts is located in one of the last medieval architectural area of Paris, in the historical district of Le Marais in the 3rd arrondissement of Paris, at the former Benedictine priory of Saint-Martin-des-Champs, which church and core architectural style was inspired by the Basilica of Saint-Denis architecture built a few years earlier.

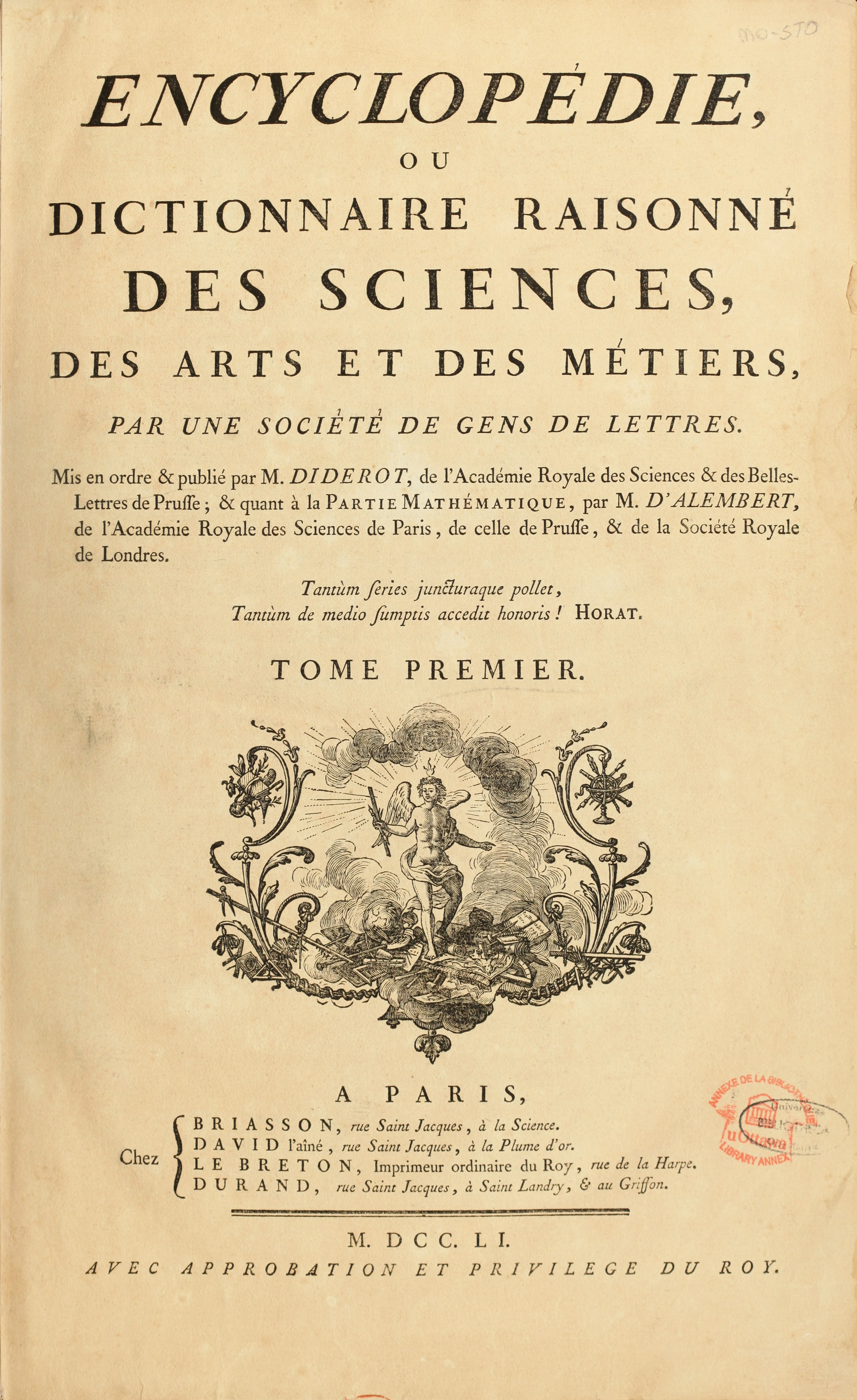
Diderot and D'Alembert's Encyclopedia, as part of the French Encyclopedist movement during the French Enlightenment era, paved the way for the creation of an institution dedicated to arts and crafts.

This large Cluniac monastery founded by King Henry the First of France in 1059–1060 on Merovingian vestige, is still visible today. The former gothic-style refectory hall dated from the 13th century remains until today and was reassigned as the library in the middle of the 19th century by the CNAM's architect: Léon Vaudoyer.

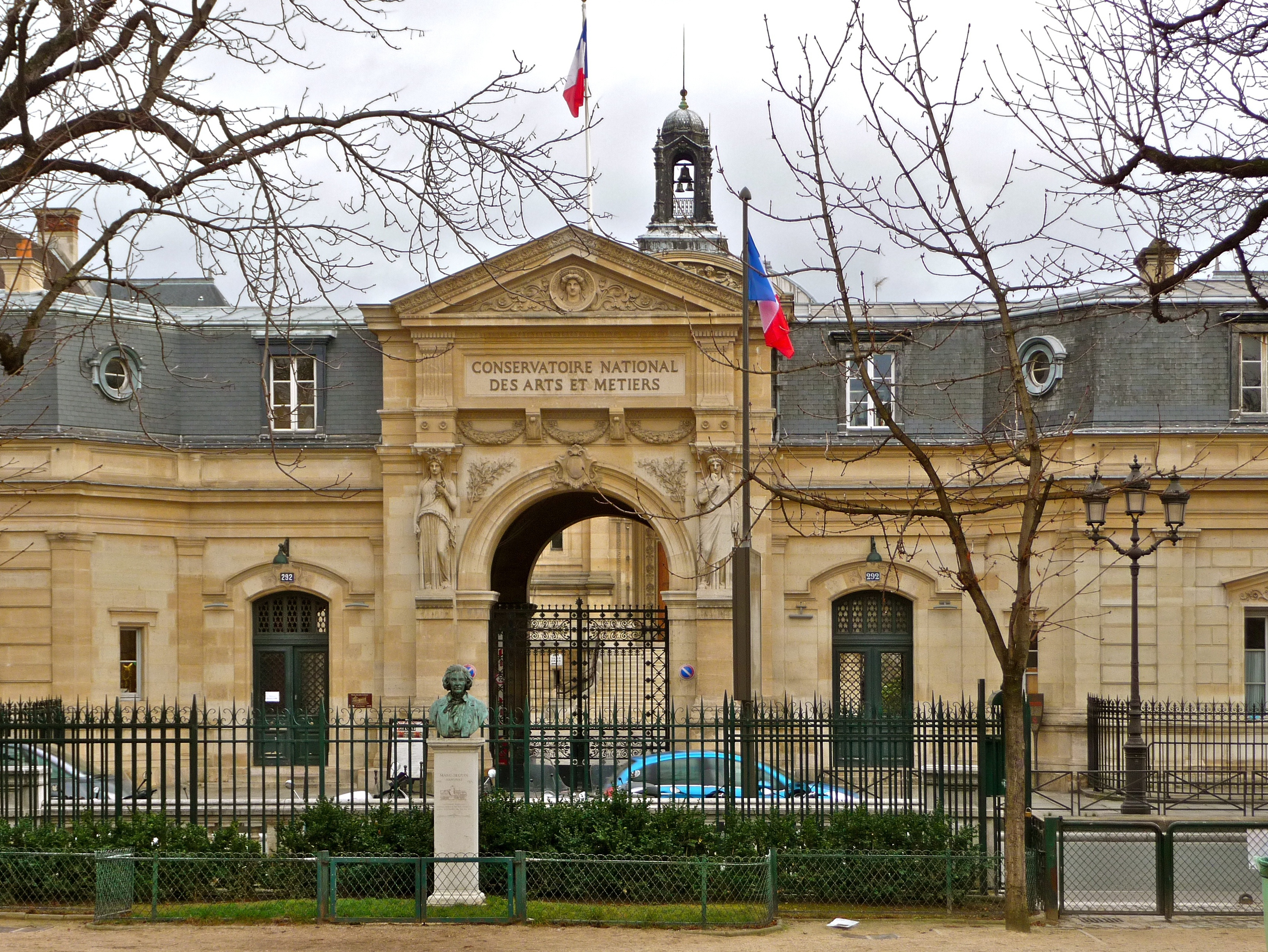
Main entrance of the Parisian Campus of the CNAM, on Rue Saint Martin - picture taken from Square Emile Chautemps.

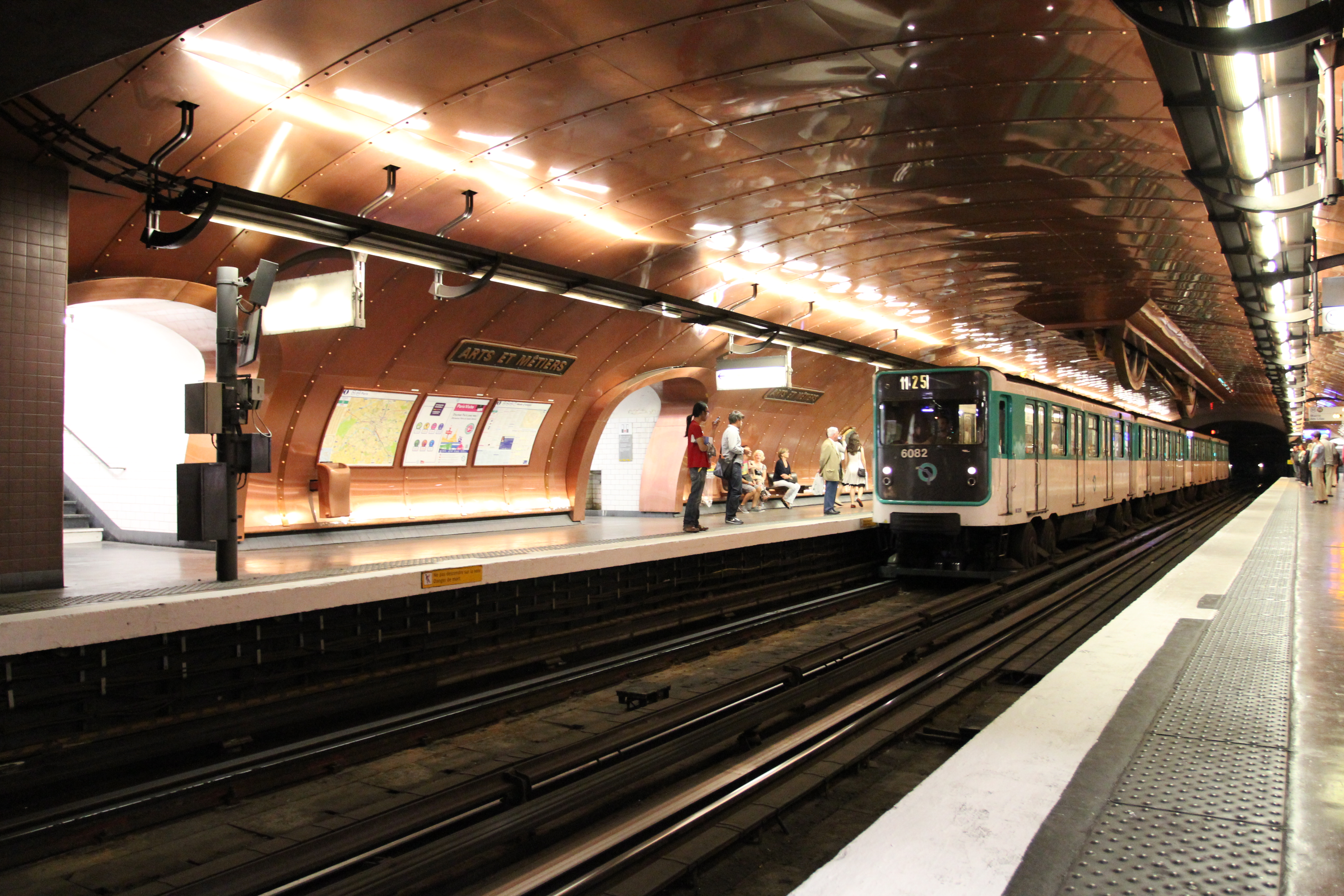
Parisian underground station of Arts & Métiers, founded in 1904, which is served by Line 3 and Line 11. For its renovation in 1988, the Ouï-dire style was applied to Line 3, whilst on Line 11, for the bicentenary anniversary of CNAM in 1994, the platforms were redesigned by Belgian comics cartoonist François Schuiten in a steampunk style reminiscent of the science fiction works of Jules Verne.

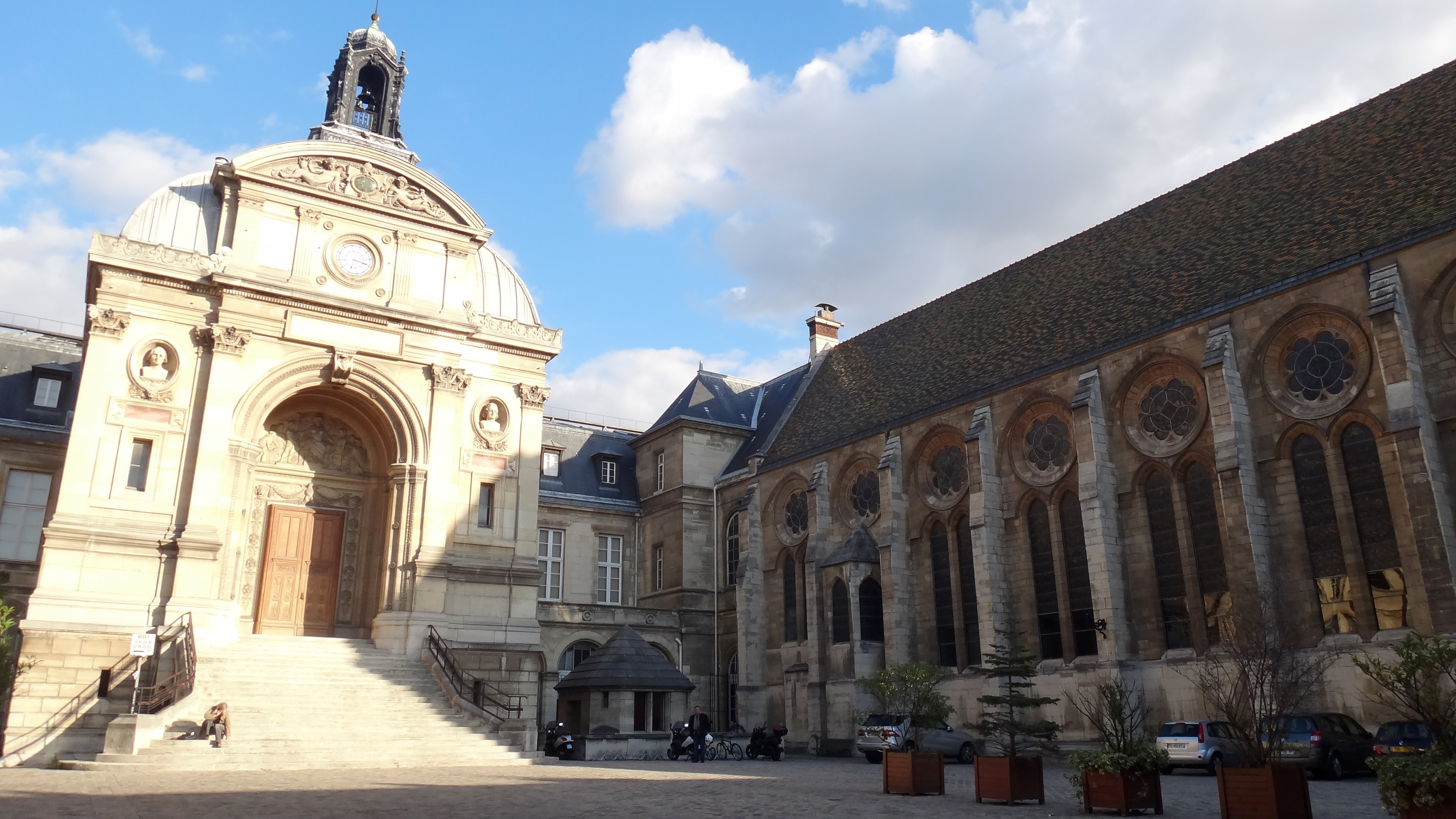
The Court of Honour of the CNAM.

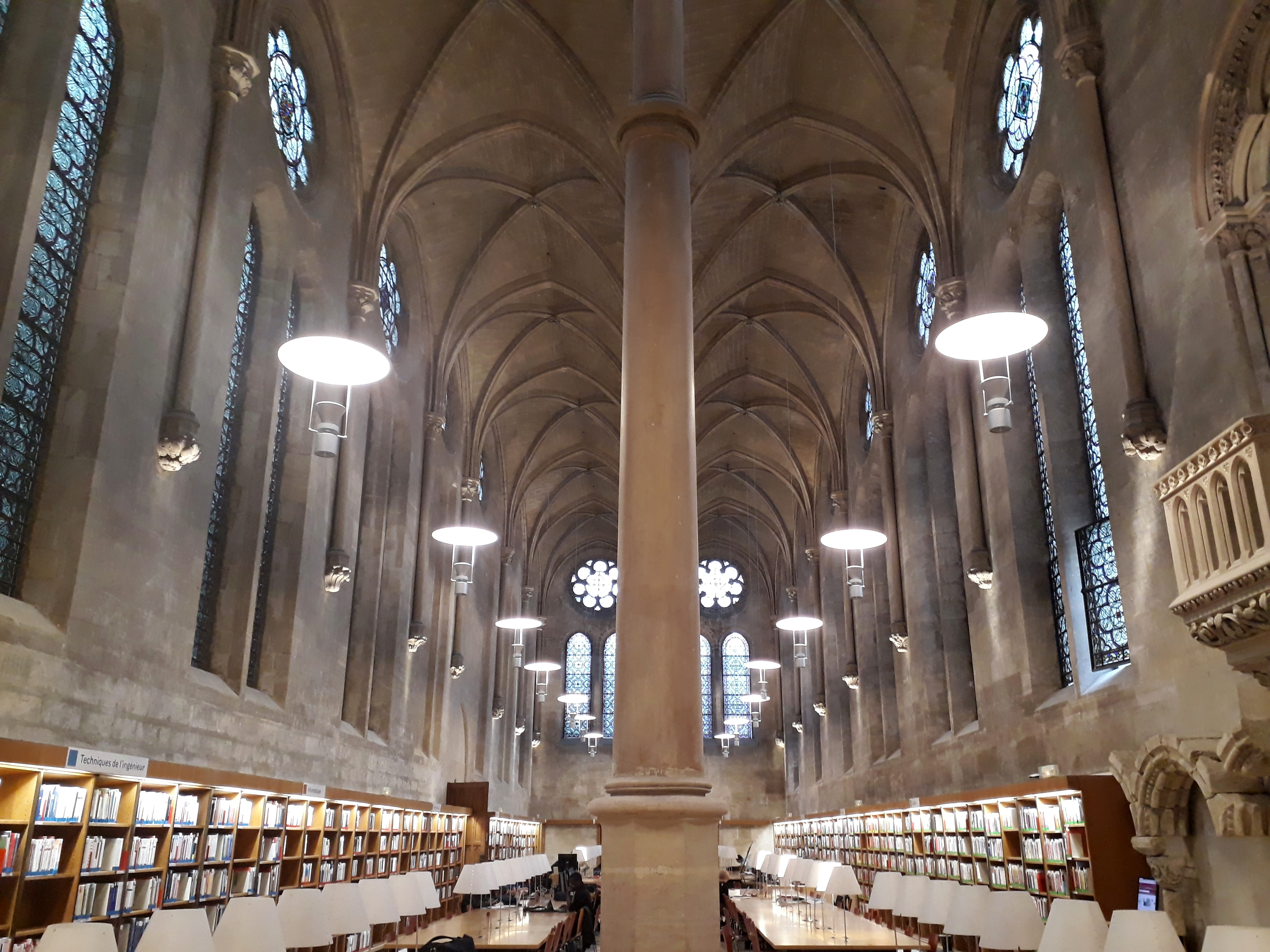
Library of the CNAM on the Parisian campus, in the former refectory of the Priory of Saint-Martin-des-Champs.

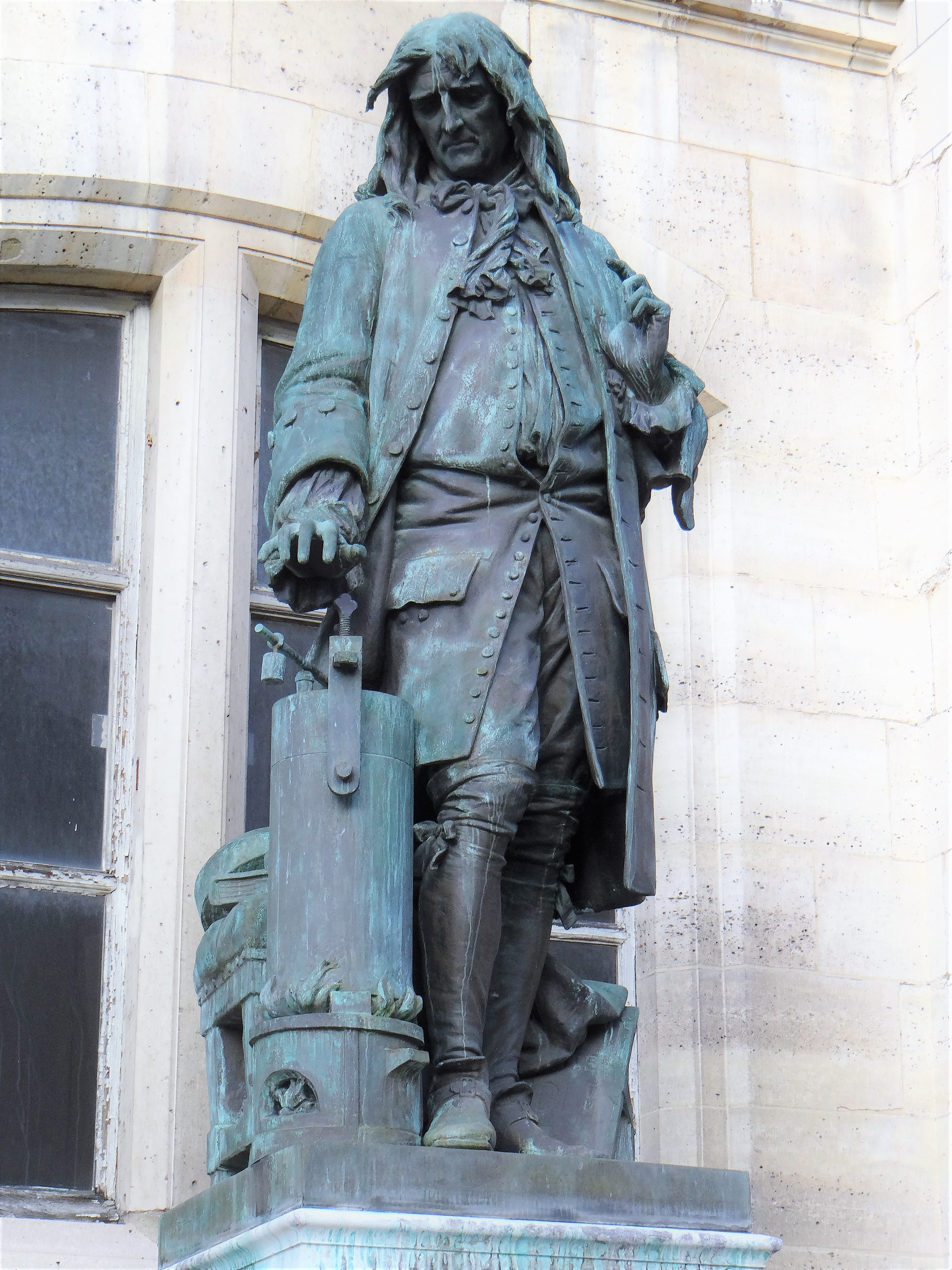
Statue of the French physicist and Huguenot: Denis Papin (1647–1713), inventor of the Steam Engine, on the Parisian campus of CNAM.

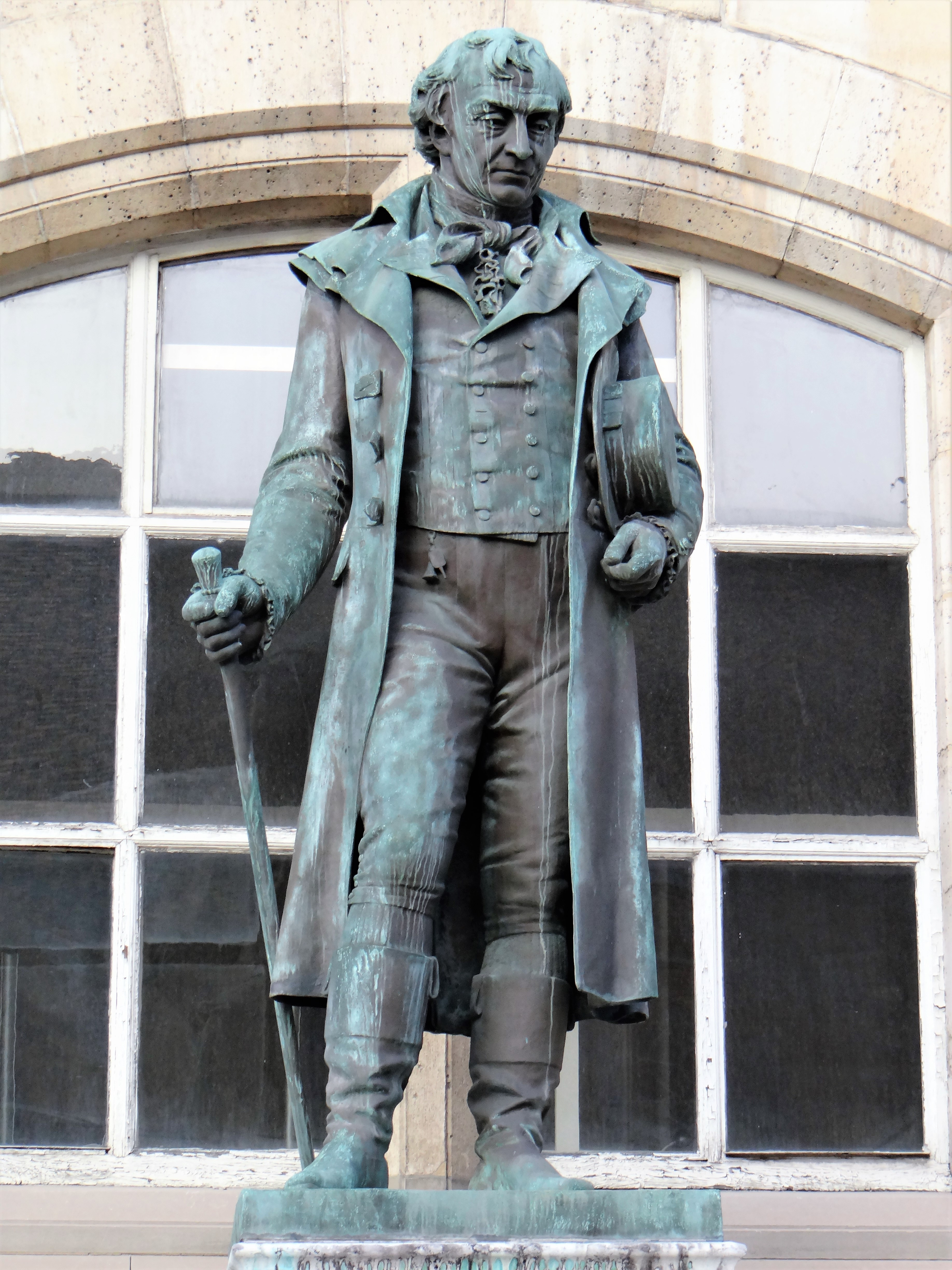
Statue of Nicolas Leblanc (1742–1806). French chemist and surgeon he invented artificial soda ash.

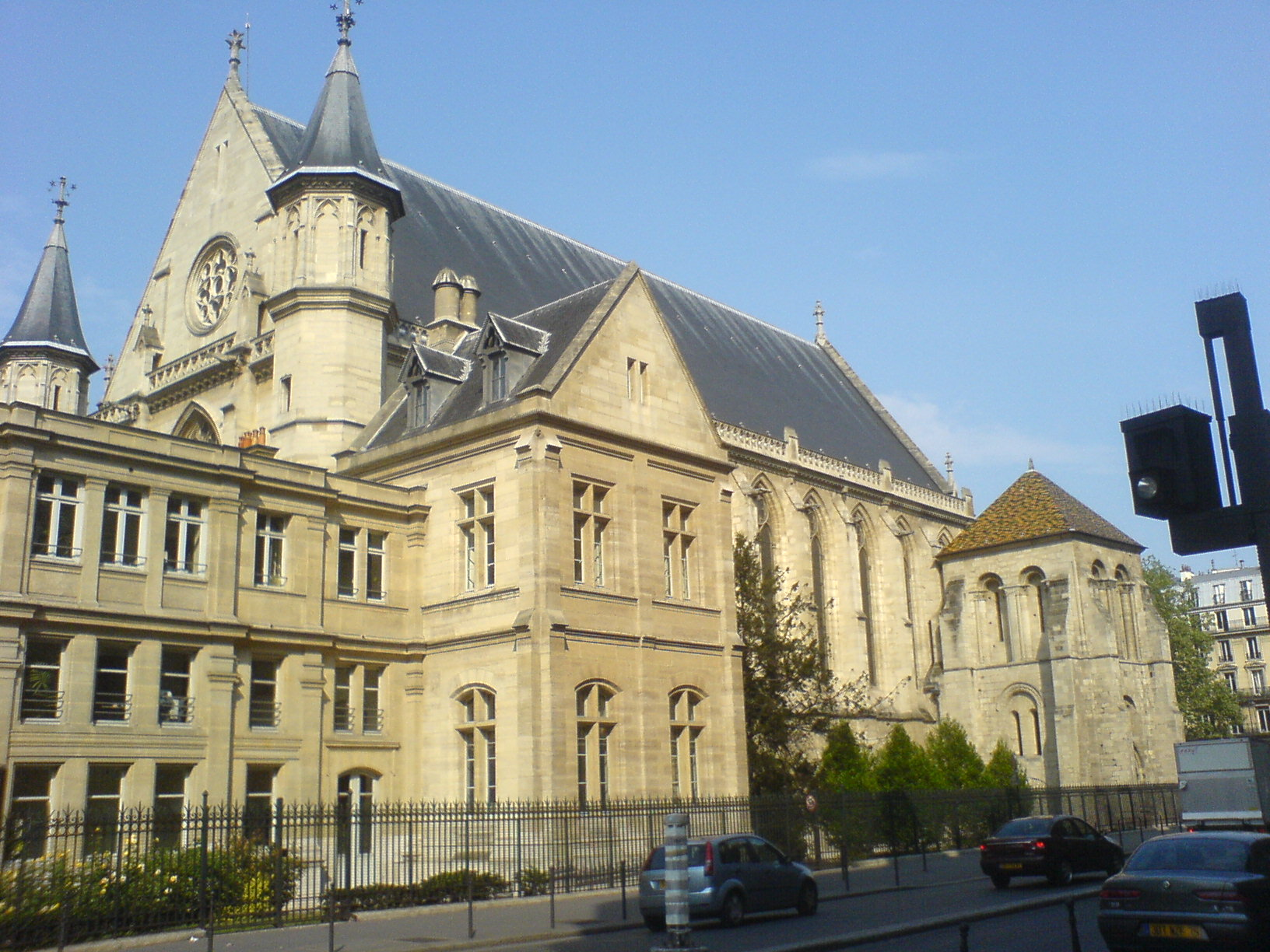
View of the CNAM Parisian campus from Rue Réaumur, a French entomologist who introduced the Réaumur Temperature scale in 1730.

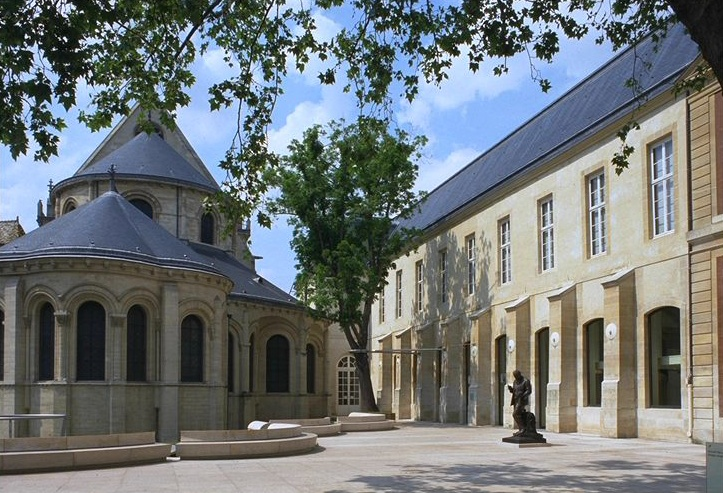
Parvis of the Museum of Arts and Crafts and Industrial Design, on the Parisian Campus of CNAM.

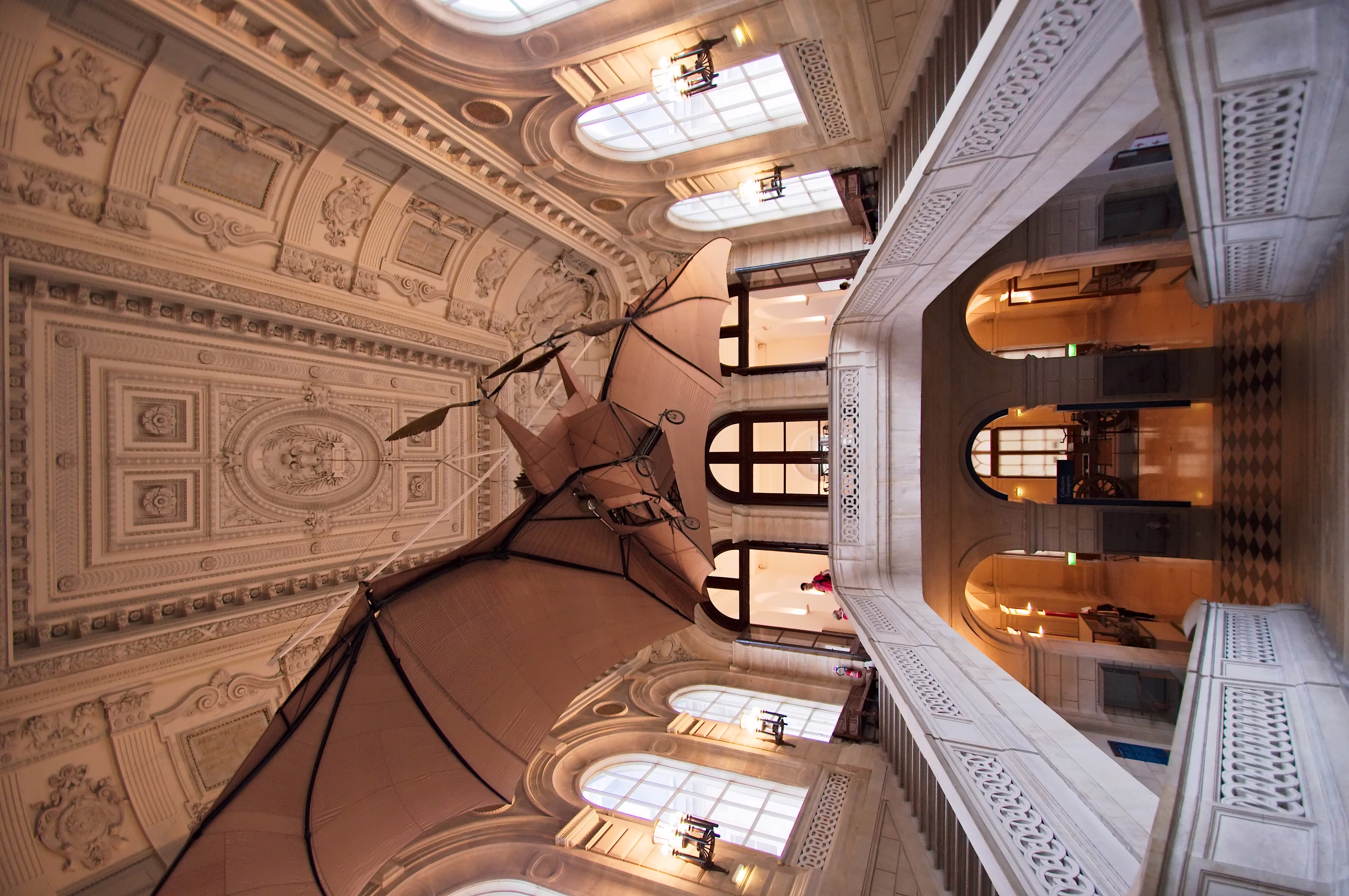
The Avion III of Clément Ader (1841 - 1926) autodidact French inventor and engineer) at the Musée des Arts et Métiers on the Parisian campus of CNAM.

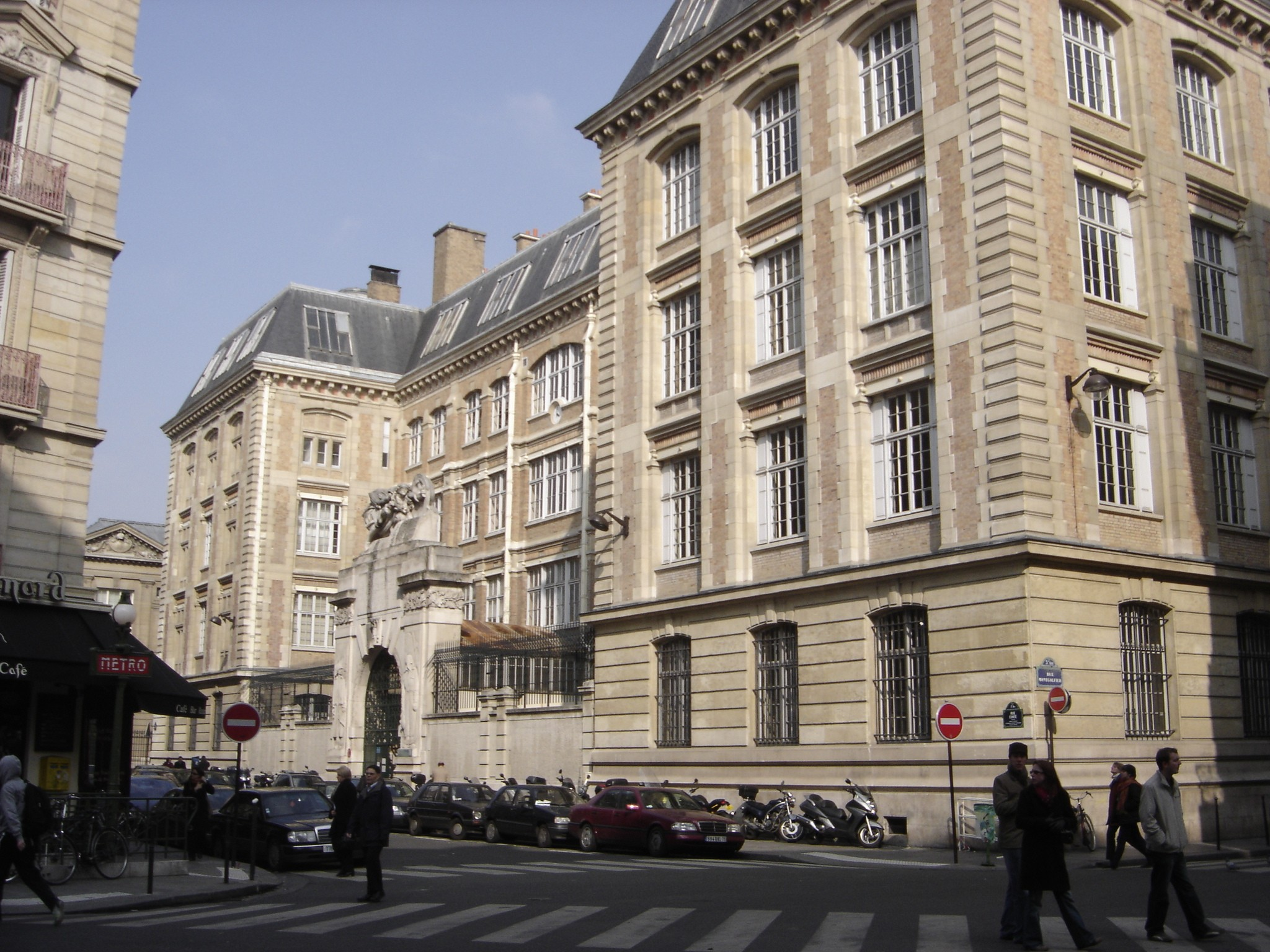
Parisian campus of CNAM, adjacent to the main Parisian campus, on the former campus of École Centrale, located on rue Montgolfier (3rd arrondissement).

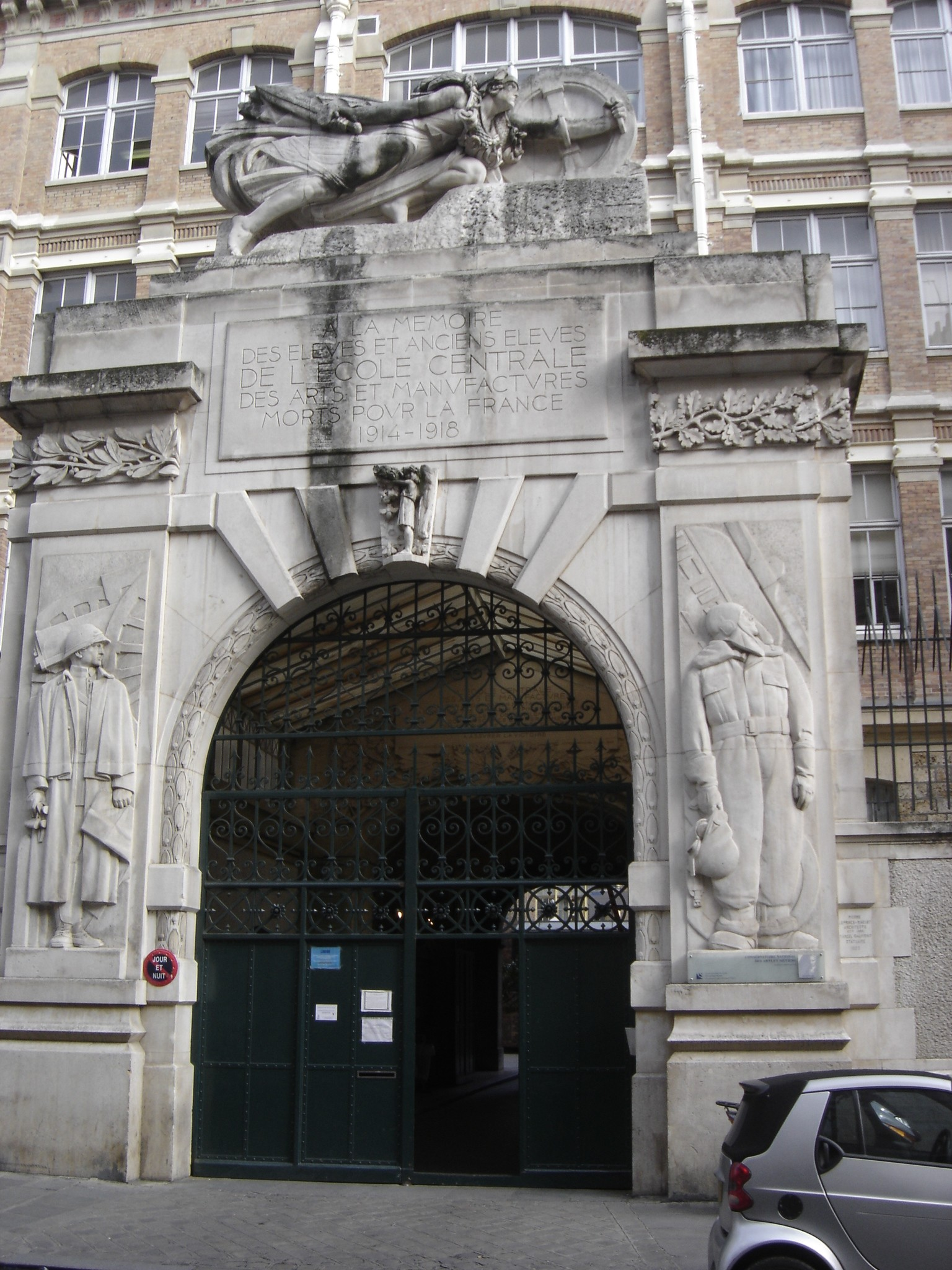
Main Entrance of the parisian campus of CNAM, adjacent to the main Parisian campus of CNAM, located on the former campus of École Centrale, situated on rue Montgolfier (3rd arrondissement).

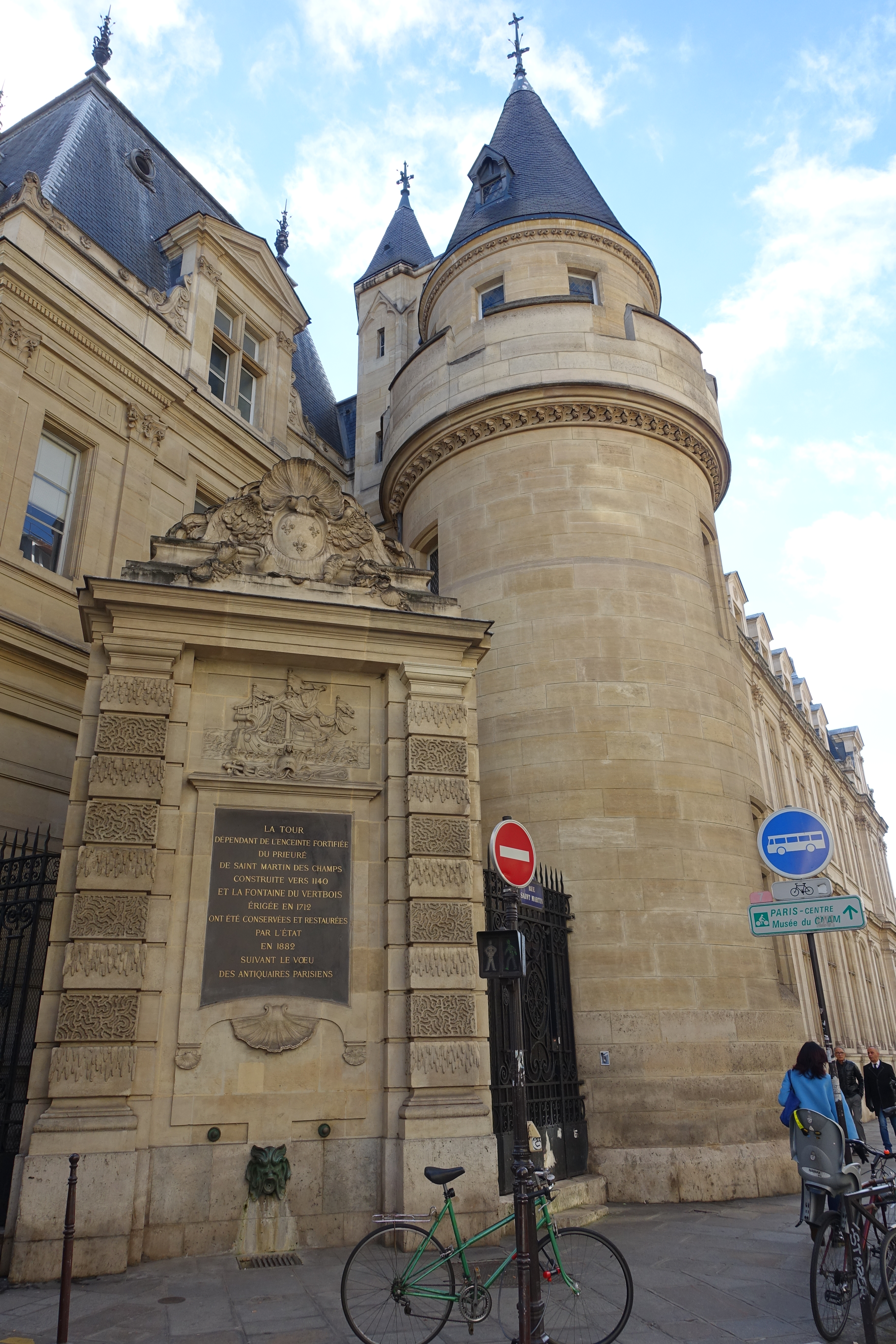
Fontaine du Vert Bois at one of the corner of the Parisian campus of CNAM, at the intersection between rue Saint Martin and rue du Vertbois.

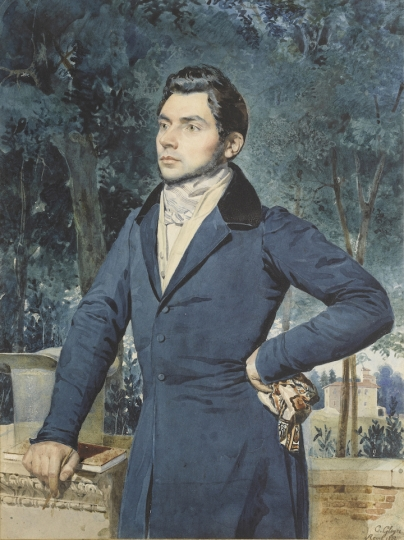
Léon Vaudoyer (1803–1872) Architect of the CNAM Parisian Campus. He designed and conducted some of the CNAM buildings of the Parisian campus, along with the Institut de France building, during the nineteenth century.

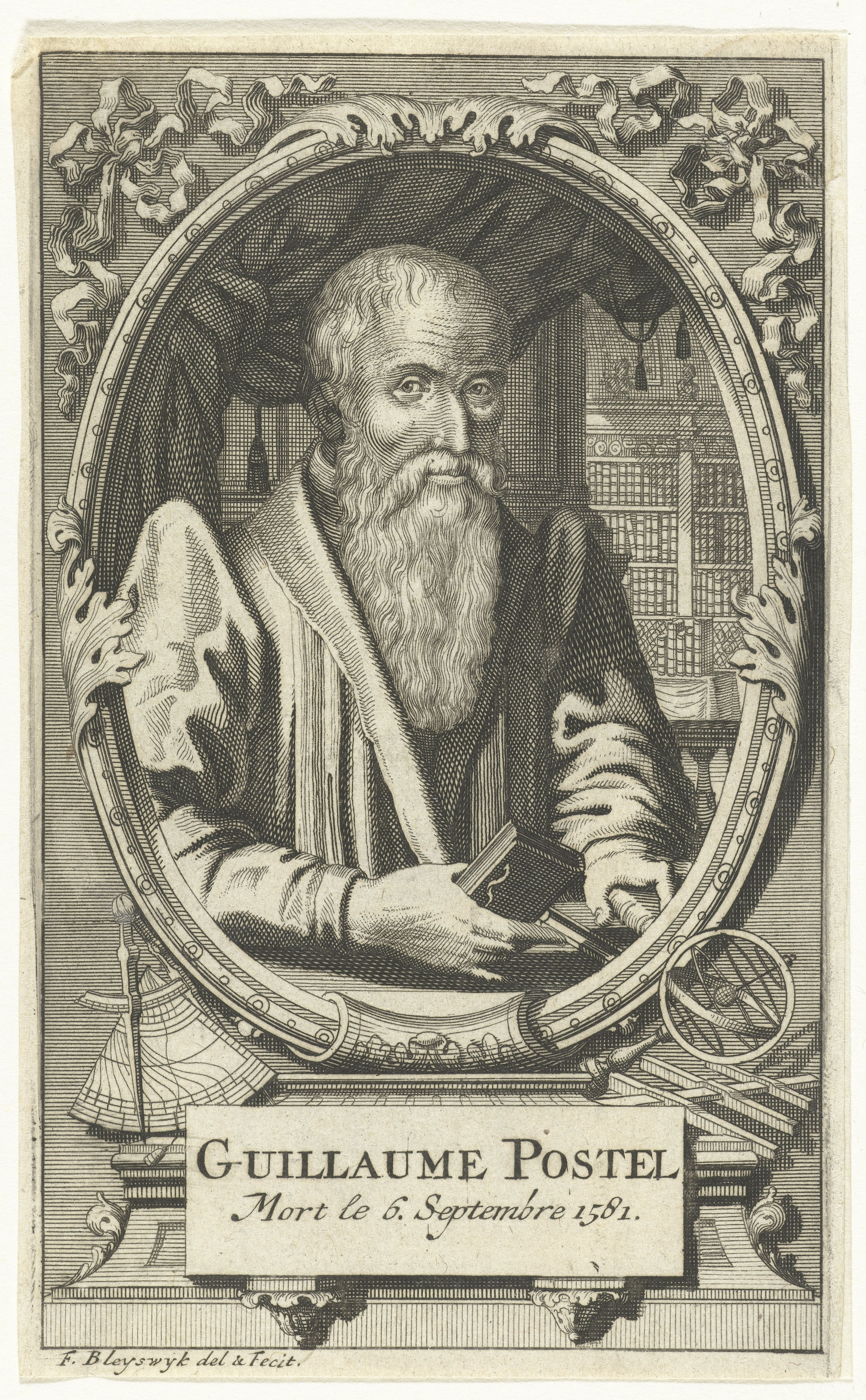
Guillaume Postel, one of the first professor of the Collège de France (another higher education institution categorised as Grand Etablissement, just like CNAM), is buried in the former priory on the Parisian Campus of CNAM.

=== Campuses in the rest of Metropolitan France ===
CNAM is based in 160 other French cities. French regional CNAM Centres are financially independent but pedagogically linked to the CNAM public institution based in Paris (namely of enrolment, selection and evaluation of candidates), and their existence is governed by a specific ministry decree. Half of the regional CNAM centres budget is allocated by the French regional councils. A student should apply through the nearest French regional CNAM in terms of enrolment, in other words, someone living in Marseille should enrol in Marseille's regional center (PACA) and not in Paris, even if his/her desired curriculum is not available in Marseille. As the vast majority of continuing education curricula are taught online, continuing education students can most of the time attend them via their nearest CNAM regional centre. Shall some specific classes be available only in Paris or at another regional centre, the student can attend these courses on-site, shall it be required (for example laboratory sessions in Life Science, Physics or Chemistry). Regional centres providing Engineering diploma via the EiCNAM, the Grande Ecole Engineer School of CNAM are all certified by the French national committee responsible for evaluation and accreditation of higher education institutions for the training of professional engineers in France (in French: Commission des Titres d'Ingénieur, abbr.: CTI). Some CNAM regional centres are hosted by other partner universities, for example the CNAM centre of Aix-en-Provence is located at the campus of the French Grande Ecole engineering and research school: Arts et Métiers ParisTech.

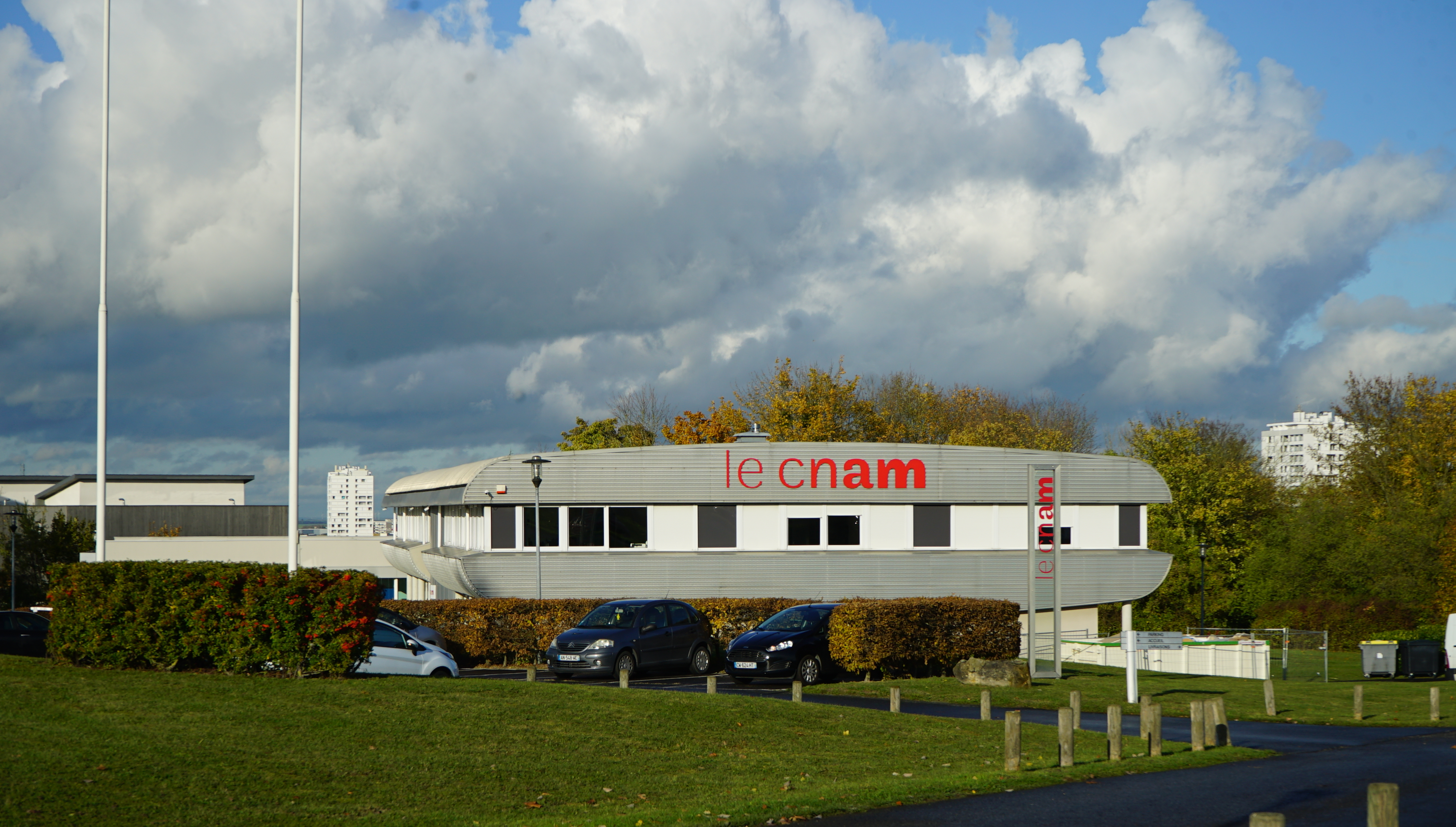
CNAM campus in Reims, Champagne province.

Campuses of the French National Conservatory of Arts Crafts (abbreviated in French as: CNAM) worldwide. This map does not take into account campuses based in mainland France and Corsica.

=== Campuses in overseas France ===
- French Guiana
- French Polynesia
- Guadeloupe
- Martinique
- Mayotte
- New Caledonia
- Réunion

=== Campuses abroad ===
Africa:

- Algeria
- Burkina Faso
- Burundi
- Cameroon
- Central African Republic
- Democratic Republic of the Congo
- Djibouti
- Gabon
- Guinea
- Ivory Coast
- Lebanon: Network of 7 campus founded since 1971.
- Madagascar
- Mali
- Mauritania
- Morocco
- Niger
- Republic of the Congo
- Senegal
- Chad
- Togo
- Tunisia

America:

- Haiti (in partnership with the State University of Haiti)

Asia:

- China: Dongguan
  - Establishment in 2017 of the Franco-Chinese Institute DGUT-CNAM, in partnership with the Dongguan University of Technology (DGUT).
- China: Wuhan
  - Founding in 2012 of the Franco-Chinese Institute of Engineering and Management, in cooperation with the Wuhan University.

Europe:

- Germany
  - In partnership with the Darmstadt University of Applied Sciences | German: Hochschule Darmstadt)
- Switzerland / France
  - The Lemanic Basin (Geneva Lake Region) CNAM Centre is a border-located and binational public higher education institute recognised by both the Swiss and French higher education systems, via the EduQua Label (The Swiss quality label for further education institutions). Classes are given in Saint-Genis-Pouilly, Annemasse and at the University of Geneva in Accounting, Economics, Engineering, IT, Law, Management and Real Eastate Management.

== Faculties and Schools ==
=== Faculties ===
On 7 July 2016, the CNAM's board of directors enacted a reform via the directory of decisions number 2016-24 AG to 2016–33 AG, which goal was to create 16 national pedagogic teams (French: équipes pédagogiques nationales | abbr.: EPN) in lieu of the School for industrial sciences and technologies (French: écoles Sciences industrielles et technologies de l’information | abbr.: Siti) and the School for Management and Society Management et société (French: école Management et Société | abbr.: MS). Some Pedagogic Teams below are also sometimes Schools per se.

- EPN 1: Building and energetics
- EPN 2: School for Surveyors, Geometricians-Topographers (Abbreviation of the school name in French: ESGT)
- EPN 3: Electronics, Electrotechnics, Automation, Measurement
- EPN 4: Mechanical Engineering and Materials Science
- EPN 5: Computer Science and Engineering
- EPN 6: Mathematics and Statistics
- EPN 7: Chemical, pharmaceutical and Food Industries
- EPN 8: Intechmer (Maritime Transport and Marine Biology)
- EPN 9: Economics, Finance, Insurances, Banking (Efab)
- EPN10: Accounting, Finance Monitoring, Audit (CCA)
- EPN 11: Territories (Geography and Sociology)
- EPN 12: Health and Solidarities
- EPN 13: Labour
- EPN 14: Law and Real Estate
- EPN 15: Strategies and Management
- EPN 16: Innovation

Schools and institutes of CNAM

- Ecole Pasteur-Cnam: School specialised in public health
- Ecole Vaucanson: first National Management and Engineering Grande Ecole Higher Education Institution for students coming from vocational baccalaureate curricula.
- EiCnam Ecole d'ingénieur.e: "Ei-" standing for: Ecole d'Ingénieur (in English: Engineering School), Grande Ecole curriculum, which like any other Grande Ecole selects students via a national competitive examination.
- ENASS: French National School for Insurances
- Enjmin: School specialised in video games and interactive media
- ESGT: School for surveyor/geometrician-topographer
- ICH: Institute specialised in Law applied to Real Estate
- ICSV: Institute specialing in Sales and Marketing
- FFI: College for Refrigeration, Industrial Cooling and HVAC engineering
- IHIE-SSET: Institute for Hygiene and Food Safety
- IIM: Institute specialised in Management
- Inetop: Institute for the study of Labour, career counselling, personal development, education
- INTD: Institute for Culture, Information, Technology and Society
- Intec: Institute for Economics and Accountancy
- Institute of Technology in Management, IT, Industrial Engineering, Physical Measurement, Material Studies
- ISTNA: Institute for Nutrition and Food Science
- ITIP: Institute for Transport and Ports

The academic staff headcount in 2020 reached 1,670, with 568 professors/researchers and 1,120 academic staff, which are called at CNAM: Biatss (French: bibliothèque, ingénieurs, administratifs, techniciens, social et santé | English: library staff, engineering staff, administrative staff, technical taff, social and health services staff).

== Doctoral college, schools and research centres ==
=== Doctoral college and doctoral schools ===
The CNAM provides via its doctoral college PhD-curricula via distance-learning (along the job), or on-site. There are 91 PhD candidates enrolled at the EiCNAM Grande Ecole engineering School, and a total of 350 professors-researchers and academic staff for a total of 340 doctoral students from 40 different nationalities enrolled at CNAM worldwide, at which 60 thesis defence/examination take place yearly. The doctoral college of CNAM comprises two doctoral schools:

- a doctoral school specialised in Science and Engineering (French: Sciences des métiers de l’ingénieur.e | abbr.: SMI), in partnership with the French Grande Ecole Arts et métiers (doctoral school code: ED 432),
- and a doctoral school Abbé-Grégoire specialised in Humanities and Arts (ED 546).

Doctoral schools in partnership with other French Universities:

- ED 591 : Physics, engineering sciences and energetics
- ED 532 : Mathematics and informatics
- ED 435 : Agriculture, biology, environment, health
- ED 146 : Sciences, technology, health
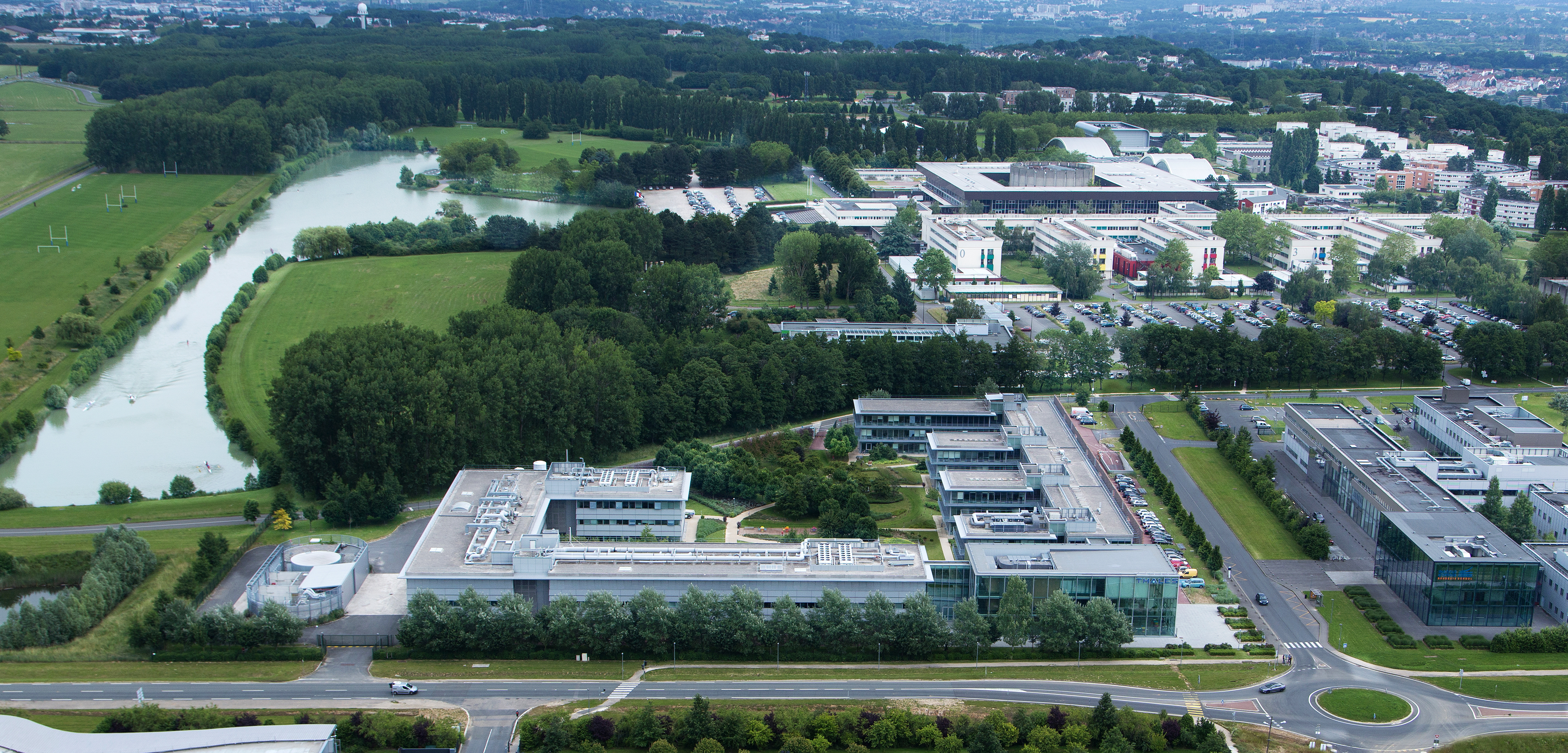
- Paris-Saclay University is a partner of Cnam, with which the latter shares a doctoral college. Paris-Saclay ranks 13 in the world in 2020 according to ARWU, 1st in Mathematics and 9th in Physics (1st in Europe), with a teaching and academic research staff of 9,000, while catering 48,000 students — which is more than Harvard or Stanford.
  Doctoral College of Paris-Saclay University.

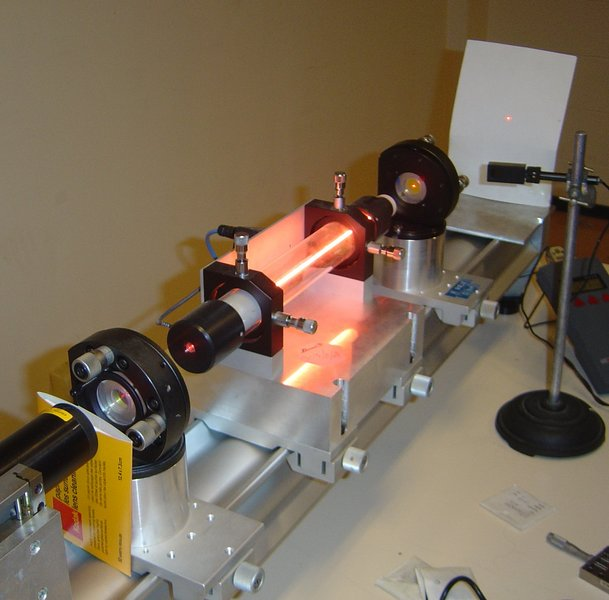
Helium–neon laser used at the LNE-CNAM: the National Laboratory of Experimental Metrology, under the aegis of the International Committee for Weights and Measures (CIPM), based in Paris and of EURAMET, which conduct research projects in cooperation with the Kastler–Brossel Laboratory, the latter being a shared laboratory of the French National Centre for Scientific Research (CNRS), the Grande Ecole École normale supérieure, the Sorbonne University and the Grand Etablissement Collège de France. Specializing in fundamental physics of quantum systems, it was named after Alfred Kastler French physicist, and Nobel Prize laureate and Jean Brossel, French physicist known for his work on quantum optics and Holweck Prize Laureate.

=== Research centres and laboratories of CNAM ===
- Cedric: Research centre in informatics and communication
- CEET: Research centre for labour and employment
- CRTD: Research centre for labour and development
- Dicen-IdF: Information system in a digital era
- DynFluid: Laboratory of fluid dynamics
- Eren: Research team in food
- Esycom: Electronics, communication systems and microsystems
- Foap: Vocational training and professional apprenticeship
- GBCM: Laboratory of genomics, bioinformatics and molecular chemistry
- GeF: Laboratory of geomatics and real estate
- HT2S: History of technosciences in our society
- Lafset: Laboratory for refrigeration, industrial cooling, HVAC engineering, energetic and thermal systems
- LCM: Shared laboratory of metrology (LNE-Cnam)
- Lifse: Laboratory in fluid engineering and energetic systems
- Lirsa: Interdisciplinary laboratory in the research for action, piloting and decision-making (applied to economics, law, management)
- Lise: Interdisciplinary laboratory for sociology applied to economics
- LMSSC: Laboratory for structural mechanics and coupled systems
- M2N: Mathematical modelling and digitalisation
- MESuRS: Modelling, epidemiology and health risk monitoring
- Pimm: Process and engineering in mechanic and material sciences
- Satie: Applications and systems of communication technologies and energetics
- SD (ESDR3C): Intelligence, security and defence, cyber-threats, crisis

=== Partner research centres ===
- GENIAL: Process engineering, food engineering
- Lusac: University laboratory of applied science in Cherbourg – Brittany (Intechmer)
- Metabiot: use of big data for the safety insurance of animal food (in cooperation with ANSES: the French Agency for Food, Environmental and Occupational Health & Safety)
- SayFood: Paris-Saclay Food and Bioproduct Engineering Research Unit (SayFood), in partnership with AgroParisTech, Inrae
- IAT: Institute in aeronautics and aerodynamics

== Curricula ==
=== Array of curricula ===
In 2022, amongst the 4366 curricula in total, the array of the Cnam's academic curricula spans the following:

- 949 Diploma registered at the National Directory of Professional Certifications (abbreviated in French: RNCP):
  - 626 Bachelor's degrees, Master's degrees and PhDs, all designed to abide by the European Bologna Process, and thus complying with the European Credit Transfer System,
  - 126 Engineering degrees (Grande Ecole and non-Grande Ecole degrees),
  - 64 RNCP vocational certificates.
- 536 Diploma and certificates not registered at the RNCP:
  - 241 CNAM Certificate,
  - 89 CNAM Diploma.
- 2201 courses, as part of a certifying curriculum, of which around 84% are solely taught remotely.
- 657 continuing education course, i.e. perfecting classes resulting in a certification.
- Other classes.

=== Grande école academic features ===
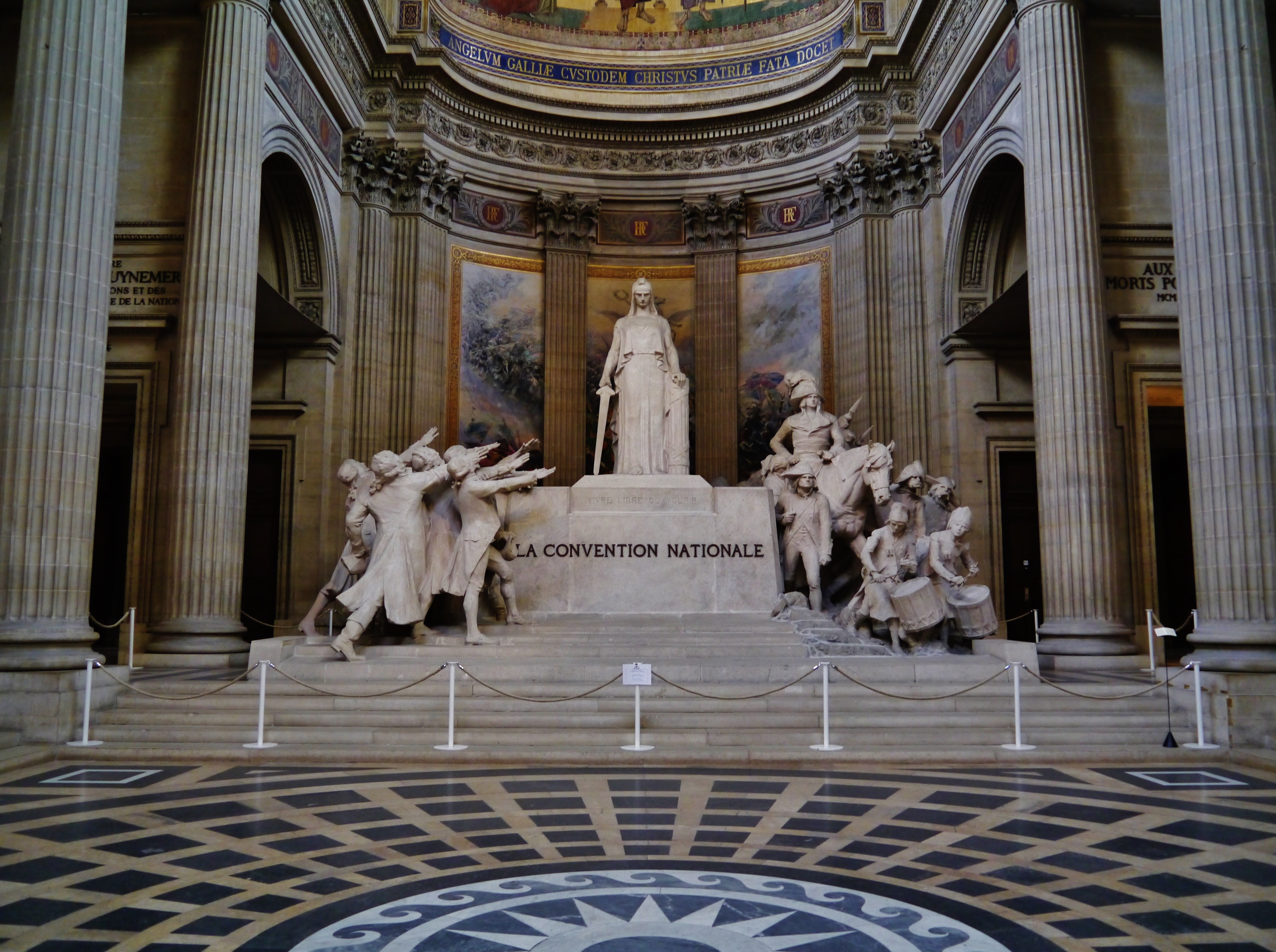
National Convention Altar or also called Republican Altar, inside the Panthéon in Paris. The term grande école originated in 1794 after the French Revolution, upon the creation of the École normale supérieure, of the École centrale des travaux publics (later École polytechnique, France's foremost Grande Ecole of Engineering, abbreviated nowadays as "ℓ'X" in French) by the mathematician Gaspard Monge and Lazare Carnot and of the French National Conservatory of Arts and Crafts by the abbot Henri Grégoire, which all resulted from the National Convention.

The French National Conservatory of Arts and Crafts is a Grand Etablissment (like the prestigious Collège de France founded in 1530), but is also a Grande Ecole which provides Grande-Ecole degrees, i.e. solely Master's Degrees, MBAs and PhDs (Grande Ecoles do not bestow diplomas lower than a European Master's degree level). A Grande Ecole, literally "Great School", is a higher education institution and part of a French league of universities, which select students via national competitive entrance examinations (in French: concours) to safeguard meritocracy and impartiality. The French National Conservatory of Arts and Crafts was one of the founding Schools of the Grande Ecole System in the wake of the French Revolution.

Grande Ecoles are separate from, but parallel and often connected to, the main framework of the French public university system. Grandes écoles, like CNAM, are elite academic institutions which enroll students via an extremely competitive process, and a significant proportion of their graduates occupy the highest levels of French society. Similar to Ivy League schools in the United States, Oxbridge in the UK, and C9 League in China, graduation from a grande école is considered the prerequisite credential for any top government, administrative and corporate position in France. The degrees are accredited by the Conférence des Grandes Écoles and bestowed upon by the Ministry of National Education (France). Higher education business and engineering degrees in France are organised into three levels thus facilitating international mobility: the Licence / Bachelor's degrees, and the Master's and Doctorat degrees. The Bachelor's and the master's degrees are organised in semesters: 6 for the Bachelor's and 4 for the Master's. Those levels of study include various "parcours" (in English: paths or curricula) based on UE (Unités d'enseignement or Modules, in English: Teaching Units or Modules), each worth a defined number of European credits (ECTS) and thus abiding by the Bologna Process of the European Union. A student accumulates those credits, which are generally transferable between curricula. A Bachelor's is awarded once 180 ECTS have been obtained (3 years of higher studies after high school, abbreviated in French as "bac+ 3"); a Master's is awarded once 120 additional credits have been reached (5 years of higher studies after high school, abbreviated in French as "bac+ 5", i.e. 2 additional years after a Bachelor's degree).

==== National competitive examinations as prerequesite of French Grande Ecoles ====
One of the prerequesite of a Grande Ecole (along with having the Grande Ecole-label), is to select students via national competitive examinations. The latter are well-acknowledged to be particularly stringent. While students prepare for these National Competitive examinations right after their high school diploma (often obtained with a magna cum laude or summa cum laude) during a two-year preparatory programme in high schools proposing such curricula; some other students will start an Undergraduate or Bachelor's degree and prepare for the national Competitive examinations along their studies at Universities or private Colleges in France or abroad. Both pathways have their own advantages and drawbacks.

As CNAM provides remote and continuous education, the access to the Grande Ecole does not require that candidates go through preparatory classes. Instead, obligatory classes and tests in Mathematics, Chemistry, Biology and English, along with a minimum required work experience (at least 6 months in a relevant field to the one the candidate wishes to apply to) and a minimum degree in a relevant field (an Undergraduate degree, i.e. 2 years of higher education after the French High School Diploma called Baccalauréat) will be expected as minimum requirements from candidates. Additionally, an interview of candidates will be conducted to select appropriate future Grande Ecole students. The Competitive Examination can only be retaken thrice.

The most selective Grande Ecole will enroll less than 10% of candidates, i.e. 90% of candidates are bound to fail, not because they performed poorly, but because a handful of students performed better, which is in itself, the principle of a competitive examination. In some Grande Ecole, it is possible to retake a Grande Ecole national competitive examination as many times as one wishes, whereas some others limit the possibilities to retake the examination to a maximum of three times.

== Notable people ==
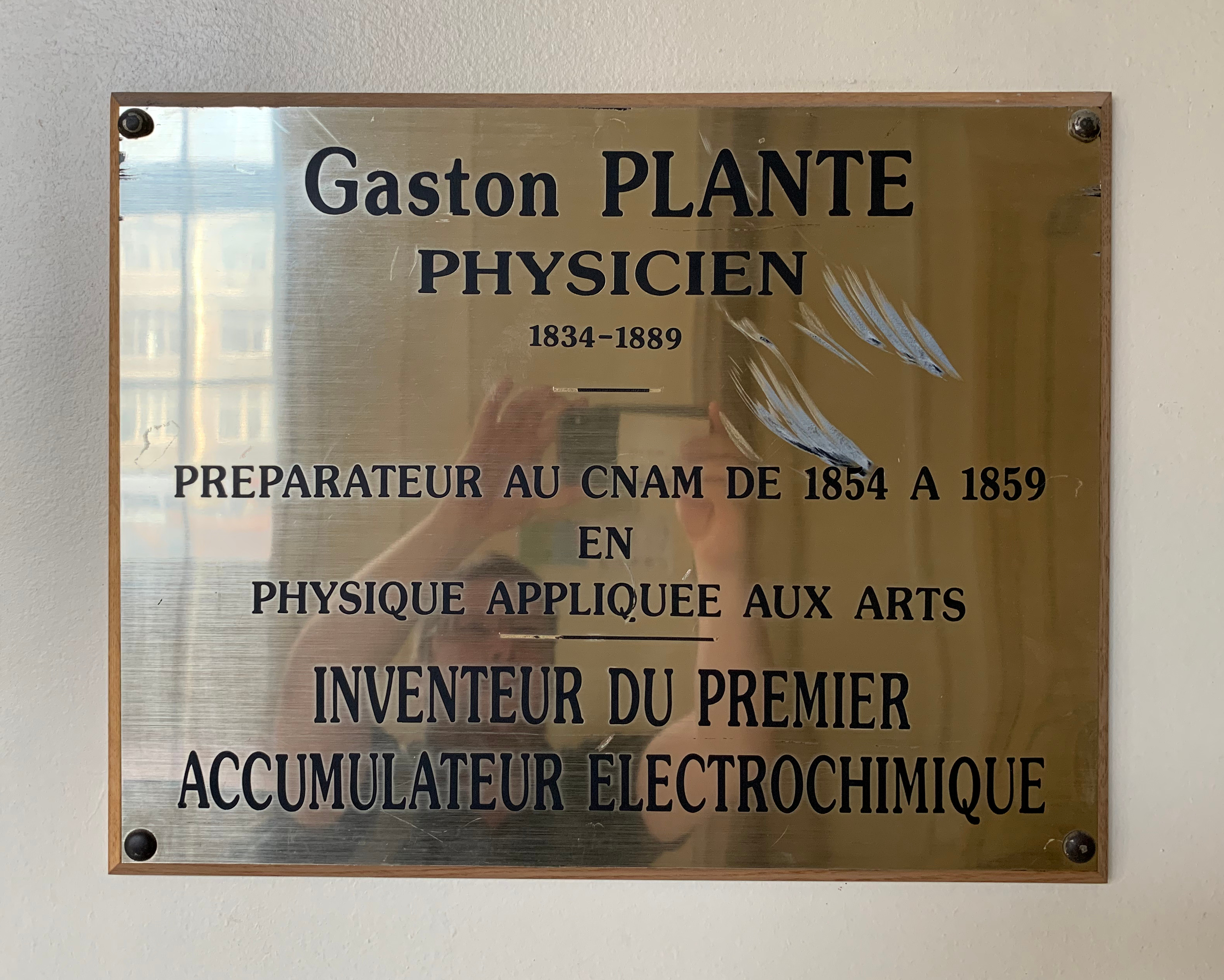
Commemorative plaque of Gaston Planté on the Parisian Campus of CNAM, inventor of the first lead-acid accumulator and first reusable lead-acid battery.

- Louis de Broglie (academic staff). Nobel Prize Laureate in Physics in 1929, member of the governance committee of the CNAM in 1945 and member of the technical committee of the test laboratory of the CNAM in 1945.
- Louis Pasteur (alumnus). Pasteur studied at the École Normale Supérieure and at the CNAM, chemist and biologist. He is regarded as one of the founders of modern bacteriology and has been honoured as the "father of bacteriology" and as the "father of microbiology".
- Nicolas Léonard Sadi Carnot (alumnus). Carnot graduated from the École Polytechnique and from the CNAM, physicist, father of modern Thermodynamics and of the Carnot-Process.
- Geneviève Meurgues (alumnus). French explorer, museologist, curator, conservator, chemical engineer and lecturer. As a professor at the National Museum of Natural History, she specialised in the conservation of natural history specimens. The Relictocarabus meurguesianus, a ground beetle discovered in Morocco was named in her honour.
- Paul Doumer (alumnus). Doumer was one of the President of the Third French Republic.
- Jacques de Vaucanson (donator). Engineer who invented the first all-metal lathe (a loom for weaving wavy fabrics) in the midst of the Industrial Revolution, gave his personal collection to the CNAM as well as his name to a street adjacent to the CNAM. As a token of his work, the Vaucanson Institute was established in 2010 by the CNAM.
- Jean-Baptiste Say (alumnus and faculty). Classical economist, Say was professor at the CNAM, and at the Collège de France.
- Mialy Rajoelina (alumnus). First lady of Madagascar. She is the spouse of Andry Rajoelina, the president of the High Transitional Authority of Madagascar from 17 March 2009 until 25 January 2014 and president of Madagascar from 19 January 2019 until 14 October 2025.
- Abbé Grégoire (founder). Later bishop, Henri Grégoire was the founder of the CNAM.
- Melchior Ndadaye (alumnus). First elected president of Burundi.
- Léon Bourgeois (academic staff). Prime Minister of France from 1 November 1895 until 29 April 1896 and Nobel Peace Prize and chairman of the board of directors of the CNAM.
- Jean Prouvé (alumnus and faculty). French metal worker, self-taught architect and designer, Prouvé was Professor at the CNAM from 1957 until 1970.
- Jacques-Alain Miller (faculty). Guest lecturer from 1995 to 2009, Miller is one of the founder members of the School of the Freudian Cause (French: École de la Cause freudienne) and of the World Association of Psychoanalysis which he presided from 1992 until 2002.
- Valérie Petit (alumnus). French politician who has been serving as a member of the French National Assembly since the 2017 elections, representing the 9th constituency of the department of Nord. From 2016 until 2020, she was a member of La République En Marche!. In parliament, Petit serves on the Finance Committee.
- Marc Seguin (alumnus). French engineer, inventor of the wire-cable suspension bridge and the multi-tubular steam-engine boiler.
- Gaston Planté (academic staff). Laboratory assistant at the CNAM and inventor in 1859 of the lead acid battery and of the first reusable battery: the lead accumulator, also called: lead-acid (storage) battery.
- Robert Solow (faculty). Guest lecturer. Solow is an Economist specialised in Macroeconomics and Neo-Keynesian economics, Laureate of the Nobel Memorial Prize in Economic Sciences which alma mater is: Massachusetts Institute of Technology.
- Sylvie Faucheux (faculty). Economist and Professor / Researcher in the Economics of Sustainability, Sustainable Innovation, Management of Smart Cities, the Economics of Ecodistricts and Green building.
- Henri Fayol (faculty and academic staff), professor and director from 1888 until 1918. He was a French mining engineer, mining executive, author and director of mines who developed a general theory of business administration that is often called Fayolism. He and his colleagues developed this theory independently of scientific management but roughly contemporaneously. Like his contemporary Frederick Winslow Taylor, he is widely acknowledged as a founder of modern management methods.
- Josef Rotblat (faculty). Physicist and professor at CNAM. Laureate of the Nobel Peace Prize.
- Yves F. Meyer (faculty). Mathematician and professor at CNAM. Meyer is a French mathematician. He is among the progenitors of wavelet theory, having proposed the Meyer wavelet. Meyer was awarded the Abel Prize in 2017.
- Margaret Maruani (alumnus), was a Tunisian-born French sociologist and director of research at the French National Centre for Scientific Research (CNRS) in Paris. She studied at Sciences Po Paris (Paris Institute of Political Studies) and the French National Conservatory of Arts and Crafts (Cnam).
- Alexandre Millerand (alumnus). He was Prime Minister of France from 20 January to 23 September 1920 and President of France from 23 September 1920 to 11 June 1924.
- Claude Cohen-Tannoudji (faculty). Guest lecturer. As a French physicist, he shared the 1997 Nobel Prize in Physics with Steven Chu and William Daniel Phillips for research in methods of laser cooling and trapping atoms. Currently he is still an active researcher, working at the École normale supérieure.
- Nicolas-Jacques Conté (founding member) was a French physicist, chemist, aerostat pilot (balloonist), portraitist, inventor of the modern pencil. He participated to the Campaign in Egypt of Napoleon. He was one of the first founding members of the original triumvirate of CNAM.
- Bernard Kouchner (alumnus) at the annual World Economic Forum in Davos 2008, French doctor and politician, he was the Minister of Foreign and European Affairs from 2007 until 2010 and Minister of Health from 1992 until 1993. He is the co-founder of Médecins Sans Frontières and Médecins du Monde. From 1999 until 2001, he was nominated as the second UN Special Representative and Head of the United Nations Interim Administration Mission in Kosovo (UNMIK).
- Francis Mer (academic staff) at the IMF in 2003. Former French Minister of Economy from 2002 to 2004. is a French businessman, industrialist and politician. A former alumnus of the École Polytechnique, and of the Mines ParisTech Grande Ecole Engineer School, he is a member of the Corps des mines. He was one of the former president of the steering committee of CNAM.
- Claude Pouillet (academic staff) was a French physicist and a professor of physics at the Sorbonne, professor and third director of CNAM as well as member of the French Academy of Sciences. Pouillet developed the Pouillet effect. He corrected Joseph Fourier's work on the surface temperature of the Earth, developing the first real mathematical treatment of the greenhouse effect. He speculated that water vapour and carbon dioxide might trap infrared radiation in the atmosphere, warming the Earth enough to support plant and animal life.
- Alain Bauer (faculty). French criminologist, professor of criminology since 2009. He is also a senior research fellow at the John Jay College of Criminal Justice (New York City) and the China University of Political Science and Law (Beijing), and Associate professor at Fudan University (Shanghai, PRC).
- Pierre Athanase Larousse (alumnus) was a French grammarian, lexicographer and encyclopaedist. He published many of the outstanding educational and reference works of 19th-century France, including the 15 volume Grand dictionnaire universel du XIXe siècle.
- Pierre-Louis Lions (faculty). Lions is a French mathematician. He is known for a number of contributions to the fields of partial differential equations and the calculus of variations. He was a recipient of the 1994 Fields Medal and guest lecturer at CNAM.
- Thibault Damour (faculty). Professor of theoretical physics at the Institut des Hautes Études Scientifiques (IHÉS) since 1989 and at CNAM. e contributed greatly to the understanding of gravitational waves from compact binary systems. He invented the "effective one-body" approach to solving the orbital trajectories of binary black holes. He is also a specialist in string theory. In 2021 he was awarded the Balzan Prize for Gravitation: physical and astrophysical aspects (shared with Alessandra Buonanno).
- Serge Haroche (faculty) is a French physicist who was awarded the 2012 Nobel Prize for Physics jointly with David J. Wineland for "ground-breaking experimental methods that enable measuring and manipulation of individual quantum systems", a study of the particle of light, the photon. He was guest lecturer at CNAM.
- Marc Fumaroli (faculty) was a member of the Académie Française of the Académie des Inscriptions et Belles-Lettres. Guest lecturer at CNAM, was a French historian and essayist who was widely respected as an advocate for French literature and culture.
- Gilles Gaston Granger (faculty). Professor at CNAM, epistemologist of the School of Analytic philosophy. His works discuss the philosophy of logic, mathematics, human and social sciences, Aristotle, Jean Cavaillès (French Philosopher and mathematician), and Ludwig Wittgenstein.
- Stéphane Le Foll (alumnus). French politician serving as Mayor of Le Mans since 2018. A member of the Socialist Party, he was Minister of Agriculture under President François Hollande from 2012 to 2017.
- Michel Cantal-Dupart (faculty). Architect and urbanist, he held the research chair for urban planning from 1998 until 2010. He was professor emeritus until 2014 and became honorary professor since then. He contributed with Jean-Marie Duthilleul et Jean Nouvel to the reflection on the Grand Paris in 2010, in a report he submitted to President François Hollande in 2013.
- Baron Charles Dupin (faculty). French mathematician, engineer, economist and politician, particularly known for work in the field of mathematics, where the Dupin cyclide and Dupin indicatrix are named after him; and for his work in the field of statistical and thematic mapping. In 1826 he created the earliest known choropleth map. He was one of the founding members of the first three research chairs of CNAM.
- Ferdinand Arnodin (alumnus). French engineer and industrialist, specialising in cableway transporters, he is regarded as the inventor of the transporter bridge, having been the first to patent the idea in 1887.
- Gaston Tissandier (alumnus). French chemist, meteorologist, aviator and editor. Adventurer, he managed to escape besieged Paris by balloon in September 1870. Founder and editor of the scientific magazine La Nature.
- Eric Girardin (alumnus). French politician of La République En Marche! who has been serving as a member of the French National Assembly since the 2017 elections, representing the department of Marne.
- Paul-Henri Sandaogo Damiba (alumnus). Burkinabé military officer who heads the Patriotic Movement for Safeguard and Restoration, having overthrown President Roch Marc Christian Kaboré on 24 January 2022 in the 2022 Burkina Faso coup d'état. He graduated with a Master's in criminology and followed classes of criminologist Alain Bauer. He views himself as an anti-Jihadi terrorism strategist and published the book:"Armées ouest-africaines et terrorisme : réponses incertaines ?".
- Arthur Morin (academic staff) was a French physicist and former Director of the Cnam. His name is one of the 72 names inscribed on the Eiffel Tower. He was named as one of the 23 "Men of Tribology" by Duncan Dowson.
- Paul Painlevé (academic staff) former chairman of the board of directors at the Cnam, was a French mathematician and statesman. He served twice as Prime Minister of the Third Republic. His entry into politics came in 1906 after a professorship at the Sorbonne that began in 1892. In the 1920s as Minister of War he was a key figure in building the Maginot Line.
- Mahammed Dionne (alumnus), is a Senegalese politician who served as the Prime Minister of Senegal from 2014 to 2019. He was the third prime minister appointed by President Macky Sall. Dionne served at the Central Bank of West African States, the United Nations Industrial Development Organization (ONUDI).
- Lucien Rouzet (alumnus), was a French physicist and inventor, who, in 1912, created a wireless telegraph system.
- Philippe Dallier (alumnus), is a French politician, and a member of the Senate of France. He represents Seine-Saint-Denis, in the Île-de-France region, and is a member of The Republicans party.
- Thierry Malet (alumnus), is a French composer of film music. He is also the designer of the very first MIDI guitars and a new 3D spatialization system for feature film music. He studied acoustics at the Cnam.
- Alexandre Vandermonde (Founding member). Mathematician. From 1794 on, Vandermonde was a founding member of the French Conservatory of Arts and Crafts, examiner with the École polytechnique, professor at the École Normale Supérieure.
  - The secret society of the French Conservatory of Arts and Crafts was coined after him, as a token of his work.
- Alain Wisner (alumnus). French doctor and a founder of the Activity-centered ergonomics but also honorary director of the Ergonomics laboratory of the French Conservatory of Arts and Crafts and President of the Ergonomics Society of French language from 1969 to 1971.
- Alice Saunier-Seité (faculty), professor at CNAM, member of the Institut de France (Académie des Sciences Morales et Politiques) former French Minister of Universities, first woman to be elected at a research chair of CNAM.
- André Sainte-Laguë (faculty), was a French mathematician and professor at the CNAM from 1938 until 1950, curator of the Mathematics section at the Palais de la Découverte. He was a pioneer in the area of graph theory. His research on seat allocation methods (published in 1910) led to one being named after him, the Sainte-Laguë method. Also named after him is the Sainte-Laguë Index for measuring the proportionality of an electoral outcome. He was a lecturer in mathematics at the Cnam.
- Benoît Roy (alumnus). Industrialist and politician, he established in 1985 the company Audiolab, specialised in hearing aid, of which he is the CEO since then. He is the honorary president of the French hearing aid association and vice-president of the European hearing aid association. He is member of the RPR, then of the UDF and finally of the Nouveau Centre political parties. He was briefly first French constituency of the Indre-et-Loire department in 2002.
- Christian Hauvette (alumnus). French architect, born in Marseilles, he studied with Jean Prouvé and was awarded the Grand Prix national de l'architecture in 1991, an award presented by the French Culture Ministry for his career in architecture.
- Ferdinand Joseph Arnodin (alumnus). French engineer and industrialist, specialising in cableway transporters, he is regarded as the inventor of the transporter bridge, having been the first to patent the idea in 1887.
- François Joseph Fournier (alumnus). Self-taught Belgian adventurer and entrepreneur who explored Mexico and the island of Porquerolles. He was born into a family of modest means, in Clabecq, Belgium and died on Porquerolles.
- François Gernelle (born 20 December 1944) is a French engineer, computer scientist and entrepreneur famous for inventing the first micro-computer using a micro-processor, the Micral N.
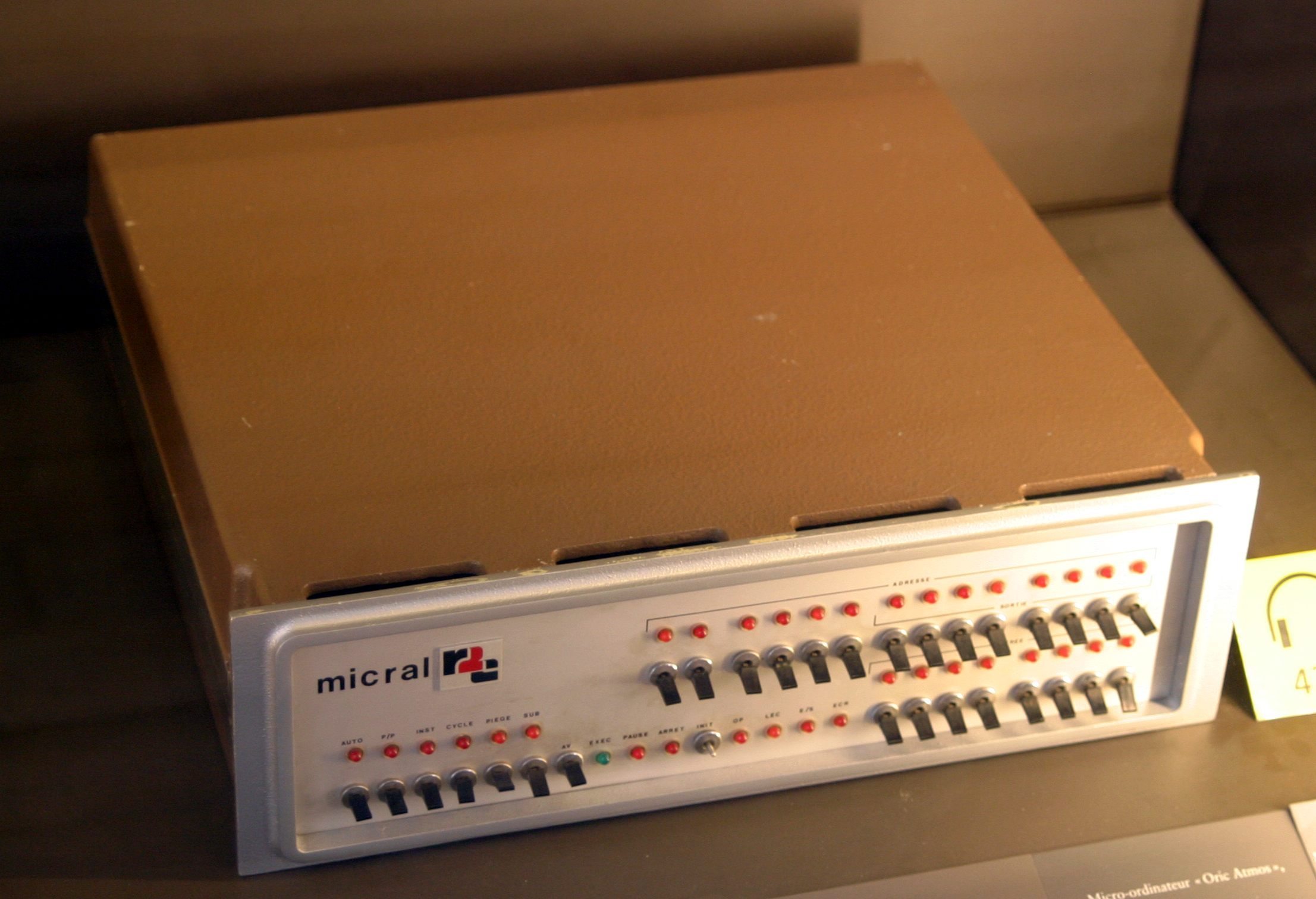
  Exhibit of the Micral N, at the CNAM Industrial Design Museum, on the parisian campus of CNAM – first micro-computer using a micro-processor in the world, invented by alumnus François Grenelle.
- Jean-Baptiste Le Roy (alumnus). Physicist and Encyclopedist, member of the French Academy.
- Jean Ferrat (alumnus). Singer-songwriter.
- Lucien Bossoutrot (alumnus). French aviator and pilot of the first public aerial transport between Paris and London in 1919, twice world-record in closed-circuit flights (8,805 km in 1931 and 10,601 km in 1932).
- Jean Salençon (academic staff), professor at the Grande Ecole École Polytechnique, President of the French Academy of Sciences and of the Institut de France, founding member of the French Academy of Technologies and member of the steering committee of the CNAM.
- Jean-Jacques Salomon (faculty), student of Raymond Aron, founder and director of the Directorate for Science, Technology and Innovation at the OECD, guest lecturer at the Massachusetts Institute of Technology, professor at CNAM.
- Michel Colomban (alumnus). French aeronautical engineer known for his home-built aircraft. He designed the Colomban Cri-cri in 1973, which follower was the model: Cri-Cri (F-PRCQ) i.e. the first all-electric four-engine aircraft in the world.
- Jean Claude Roman, graduate in Computer Science.
- Navi Radjou (alumnus). French-Indian born in French-speaking Puducherry, scholar, innovation and leadership advisor based in the Silicon Valley. He is a Fellow at the Judge Business School at the University of Cambridge and has spoken and written widely on the theme of frugal innovation.
- Pierre Bézier (faculty), former professor at the Cnam, was a French engineer and mathematician, and one of the founders of the fields of solid, geometric and physical modelling as well as in the field of representing curves, especially in computer-aided design and manufacturing systems. As an engineer at Renault, he became a leader in the transformation of design and manufacturing, through mathematics and computing tools, into computer-aided design and three-dimensional modelling. Bézier patented and popularized the Bézier curves and Bézier surfaces that are now used in most computer-aided design and computer graphics systems.
- Stasys Ušinskas (alumnus). Lithuanian artist of multiple creative fields: modern painting, stained glass, scenography, animation, puppetry and decorative glass artworks. He is widely regarded as the "father of Lithuanian stained glass art".
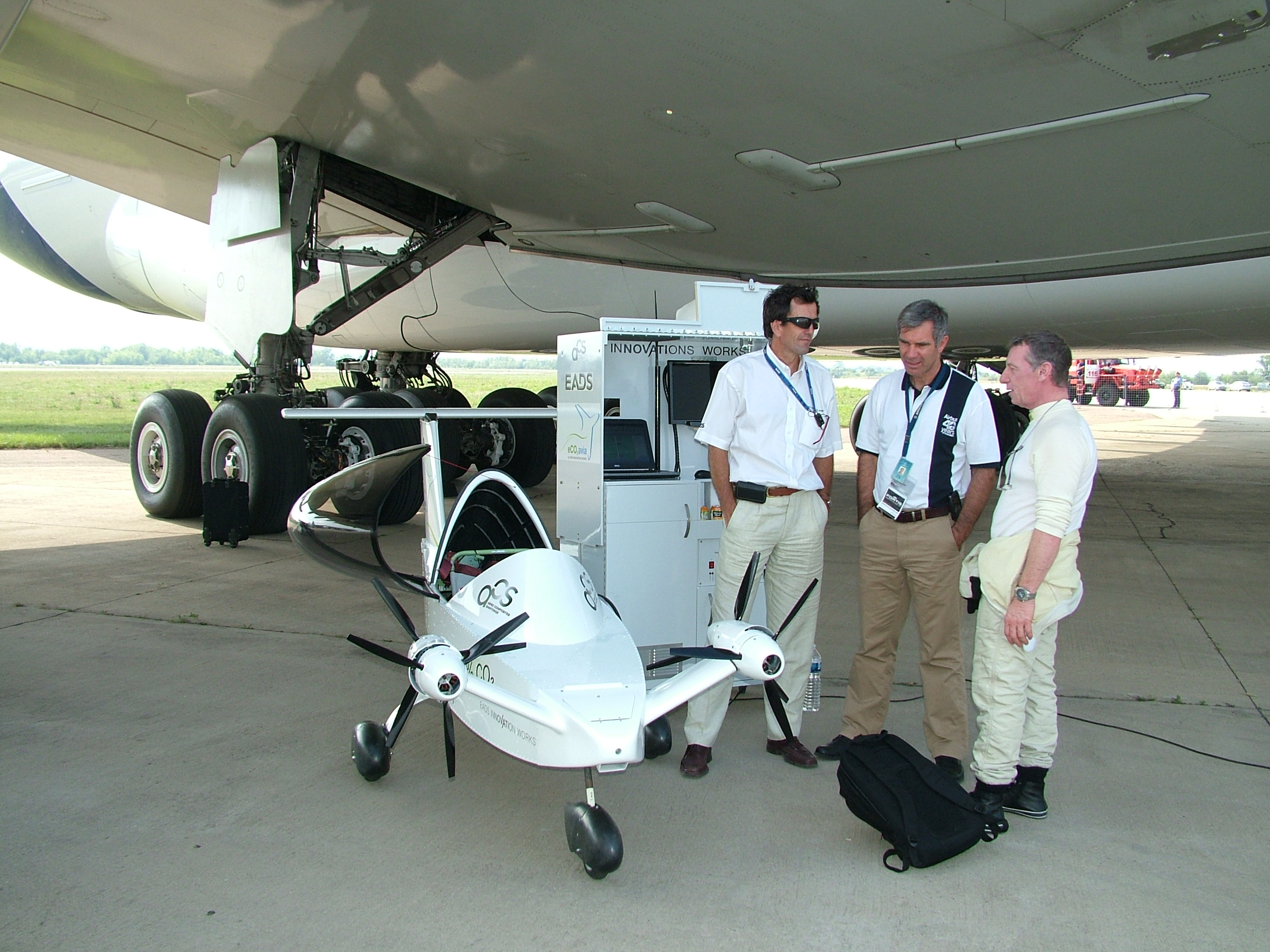
- The Colomban Cri-cri (Cricket) F-PRCQ exhibited under an Airbus A380 at the 2011 MAKS airshow, the world's first all-electric (CO2-neutral) 4-engine aircraft developed by EADS Innovation Works and manufactured by Aero Composites Saintonge, following alumnus Michel Colomban's Cri-Cri aircraft series.
  Terence John Quinn CBE FRS (alumnus) is a British physicist, and emeritus director of the International Bureau of Weights and Measures in Paris, where he was director from 1988 until 2003. He is since 2000 Doctor Honoris Causa at CNAM.

Example of Bézier curve, invented by Cnam alumnus, engineer and mathematician Pierre Bézier.

== Traditions ==
- Vandermonde : secret society of the French Conservatory of Arts and Crafts, allegedly based on the Skull & Bones model of Yale University.
- At the French Conservatory of Arts and Crafts, students are commonly (and also officially) called "auditeurs", referring to audience/listener (instead of "étudiants", in English: students).

Graduates from the Grande Ecole Engineering School: EiCNAM, receive coloured graduation scarf during the diploma bestowal ceremony, depending on the major they belong to:

- Building and public works Engineering, Energetics Engineering, Nuclear Power Engineering,
- IT Engineering,
- Bioinformatics Engineering, Chemical Engineering, Bio-Engineering, Process Engineering, Risk Management Engineering,
- Automation and Robotics Engineering, Electrical Engineering,
- Electronic Systems Engineering, Electronic Systems, Telecommunication and IT Engineering, Electronic system and railway signalling Engineering,
- Aeronautics and Aerospace Engineering, Rail Operation Engineering,
- Material Engineering, Mechanical Engineering, Mechatronics Engineering.

== Foundation ==
In 1973, the Louis-de-Broglie Foundation was created at the French National Conservatory of Arts and Crafts by Nobel Prize Laureate in Physics Louis de Broglie along with Physics Nobel-Prize Laureate Louis Néel, and Fields Medallist René Thom, on the occasion of the fiftieth anniversary of the discovery of matter waves. It is now located at the French Academy of Sciences in Paris.

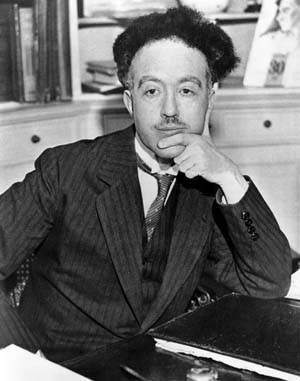
Louis de Broglie (1892–1987) Nobel Prize Laureate in Physics.

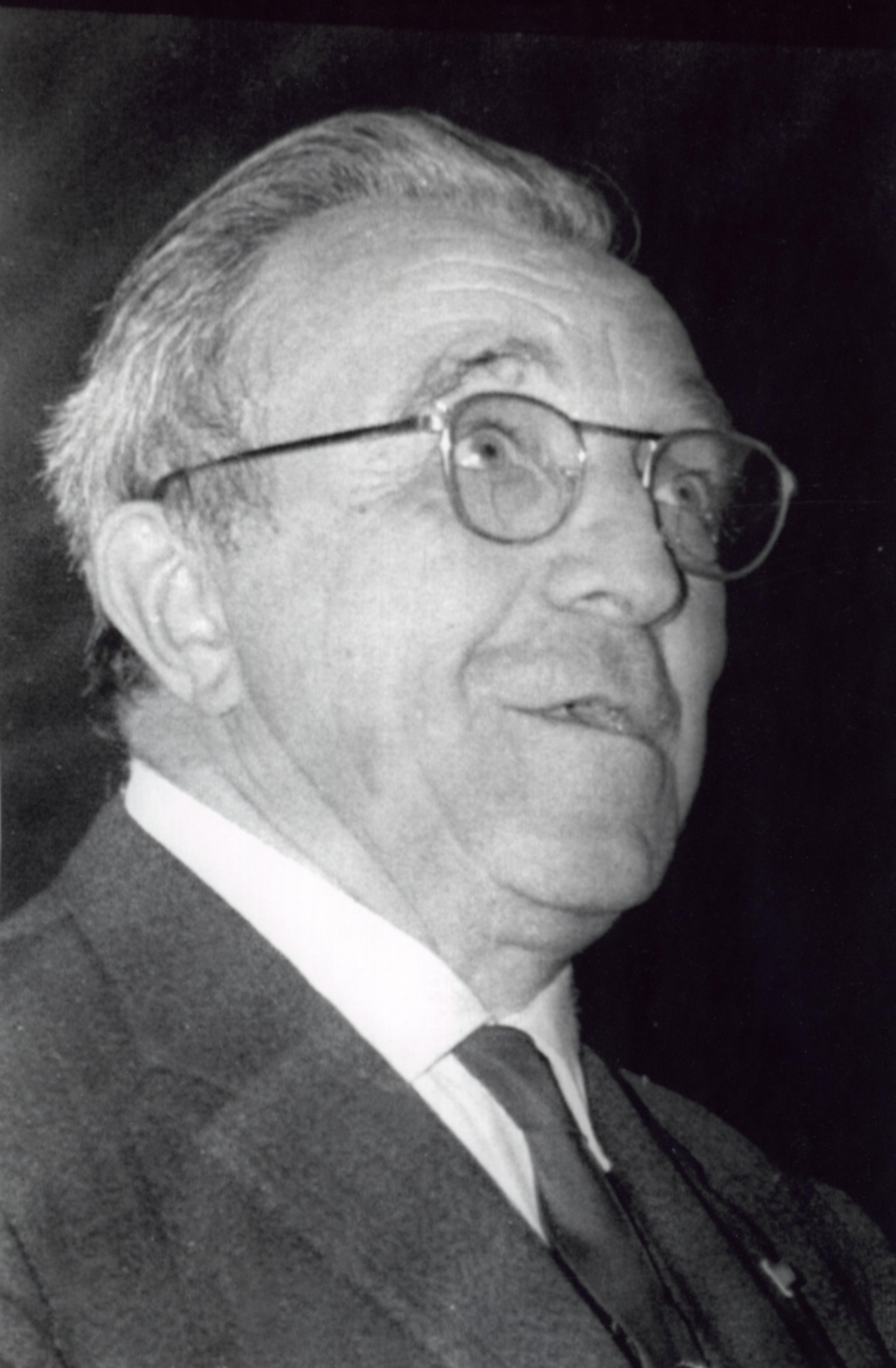
Louis Néel (1904– 2000) Nobel Prize Laureate in Physics.

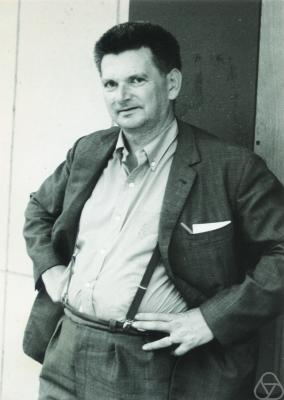
René Thom (1923–2002) Fields Medallist.

== Affiliations and memberships ==
CNAM is a part of HeSAM (French: Hautes Écoles Sorbonne Arts et Métiers University), a cluster for higher education and research as a group of universities and institutions comprising 11 members and 4 associated institutions, totalling 110,000 enrolled students.

The members are:

- École nationale supérieure des arts et métiers (Arts et Métiers)
- CESI (enseignement)
- French National Conservatory of Arts and Crafts (CNAM)
- École Boulle
- École Duperré
- École Estienne
- École nationale supérieure des arts appliqués et des métiers d'art (ENSAAMA)
- École nationale supérieure d'architecture de Paris-La Villette (ENSAPLV)
- École nationale supérieure de création industrielle (ENSCI – Les Ateliers)
- Institut Français de la Mode (IFM)
- Paris School of Business (PSB)

== See also ==
(in French) Écoles de l'an III scientifiques
