= Alain Wisner =

French doctor

Alain Wisner (2 November 1923, in Paris – 3 January 2004, in Paris) was a French doctor and a founder of the Activity-centered ergonomics but also honorary director of the Ergonomics laboratory of the Conservatoire National des Arts et Métiers (CNAM) and President the Ergonomics Society of French language from 1969 to 1971.

He has founded in 1955 the first ergonomics service of the French carmaker Renault, and became in 1962 teacher at the Physiology of Labor Laboratory of the Conservatoire National des Arts et Metiers in Paris, France. He has Developing a particular approach to ergonomics with Antoine Laville which says the work and health at work can not be studied only in laboratory, they carry the research field in the companies. The work they perform on the mental activity of the chain workers in the late 1960s, upset look on the "manual labor".

When he became Director of the Physiology of Labor Laboratory of the CNAM in 1966, Alain Wisner evolves it into an Ergonomics Laboratory. There will develop training that will have an important role in disseminating Ergonomics focused on the activity. Thousands of ergonomists in Europe, North and South America, Africa and Asia are pupils or students of his students.

Alain Wisner is the founder of the paradigm of anthropotechnology. Little known in the social sciences, this paradigm develops from the 1970s and is part of a transformative approach to the processes of technology transfer influenced by various social science work in the field of relations between technology and society. In terms of research, anthropotechnology aims to produce knowledge about the social forms of "appropriations" of technical objects.

A.Wisner is the only person to have received three distinctions from the International Ergonomics Association (IEA):

- IEA Distinguished Service Award, 1985
- IEA Ergonomics of Technology Transfer Award 1991
- IEA Fellow

== Bibliography ==
- Wisner, A. (1985). Quand voyagent les usines. When plants traveling . ed: Syros - atelier futur. https://web.archive.org/web/20100331234059/http://www.ergonomie-self.org/media/media40383.pdf
- Wisner, A. (2010). A Inteligência no Trabalho: textos selecionados de Ergonomia. Ed. Fundacentro. http://www.fundacentro.gov.br/dominios/CTN/indexPublicacao.asp?D=CTN&C=2176&menuAberto=196
- Wisner, Alain. (1989). La nouvelle usine en pays en développement industriel, in Keiser (de), V. & Van Daele, A. (éd.), L’ergonomie de conception, Editions universitaires, pp. 11–27
- Wisner, Alain. (1994). La cognition et l’action situées : conséquences pour l’analyse ergonomique du travail et l’anthropotechnologie", Actes du Congrès de Toronto, I.E.A.
- Wisner, Alain. (1997). Anthropotechnologie. Vers un monde industriel pluricentrique, Toulouse, Octares
