= Rouzet =

Rouzet is a French surname. Notable people with the surname include:

- Jacques-Marie Rouzet (1743–1820), comte de Folmon, French politician
- Lucien Rouzet (1886–1948), French physicist and inventor
