= Jean Salençon =

French physicist

Jean Salençon is a French physicist born on November 13, 1940. He is a member of the French Academy of Sciences and the French Academy of Technologies.

== Biography ==
An engineer with degrees from the École Polytechnique (X1959) and the École nationale des ponts et chaussées (1964), a doctor of science (Université Pierre et Marie Curie, 1969), Jean Salençon was a professor at the École nationale des ponts et chaussées from 1977 to 1998 and a professor at the École polytechnique from 1982 to 2005. He has also taught at several prestigious schools and universities in France and abroad. He was non-resident Rector of CISM (Udine) from 2004 to 2012 and a member of several university or industrial scientific councils in France and abroad and of the Board of Directors of the Conservatoire national des Arts et Métiers (CNAM) from 2005 to 2011.

A member of the Academy of Sciences since 1988, he was its president in 2009 and 2010 and, as such, chaired the Institut de France in 2009. Jean Salençon is an honorary general engineer in the field of civil engineering and was a founding member of the Academy of Technology.

== Scientific work ==
Jean Salençon's research work concerns the mechanics of continuous media, the calculation of structures and civil engineering structures, and the irreversible behaviour of solid materials for industrial applications.

He was particularly interested in the irreversible behaviour of materials (plasticity, viscoelasticity and their industrial applications. He is the author of the theory of computation at break which he implemented for the first global computation of the bearing capacity of surface foundations on homogeneous or heterogeneous isotropic soils or anisotropic soils and also for stability analyses of earth and reinforced soil structures. In the case of foundations or structures subjected to seismic loads, the method is used for "pseudo-static" analyses. He also developed this theory in the probabilistic framework both from the point of view of material strength and stress and showed that it is the theoretical basis for ultimate limit state design (ULSD), which is incorporated in some current design regulations.

== Honours and awards ==
He is a member of the Academy of Sciences, the Academy of Technology, the Istituto Lombardo, Milan (foreign member), the Academia das Ciéncias de Lisboa (foreign member), the Hungarian Academy of Sciences (honorary member), the Academia Europaea, the Hong Kong Institute for Advanced Study (Senior Fellow), the Montpellier Academy of Sciences and Letters (correspondent).

He is Commandeur of the Ordre de la Légion d'Honneur, Commandeur of the Palmes Académqiues and Officier of the Ordre du Mérite.
