= École nationale supérieure de création industrielle =

French design college

ENSCI–Les Ateliers
- Type: Public (EPIC)
- Established: November 8th, 1982
- Budget: 7,432,000€ (2011)
- Director: Frédérique Pain, since 2020
- Students: 323
- Location: Paris, France; 48.858378°N 2.369298°E
- Campus: Paris
- Affiliation: héSam, CGE
- Website: www.ensci.com
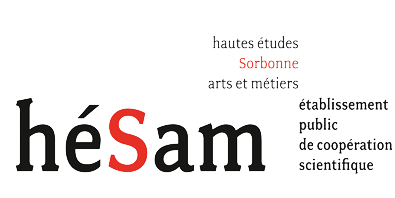

ENSCI–Les Ateliers, the École nationale supérieure de création industrielle, is a French design school located in the 11th arrondissement of Paris. As a public commercial and industrial establishment under authority of both the Ministry of Culture and the Ministry of Industry, it is the first and only French national institute exclusively devoted to the advanced studies in design. It is a member of the Hautes Études-Sorbonne-Arts et Métiers cluster and of the Conférence des grandes écoles.

The school was founded in 1982 under the sponsorship of Jean Prouvé and Charlotte Perriand, and has been established in the same building that once housed the Ateliers Saint-Sabin of the Maison Jansen, hence its name; its premises are open 24 hours a day and seven days a week, enabling students to work according to their own production schedules and patterns. It has been classed number one design school in the Americas & Europe region by the 2011 Red Dot Award: Design Concept ranking, and the best design school in France by the 2012 L'Étudiant ranking. It is also one of the 60 best design schools in the world according to the 2007 Businessweek D-Schools list.

== Degrees and programmes ==
The school offers five different programmes:

- Master's degree in Industrial Design (Diplôme de créateur industriel)
- Master's degree in Textile Design (Diplôme de l'Atelier national d'art textile)
- Specialized Master in Design and Contemporary Technology (Mastère spécialisé Création et technologie contemporaine)
- Specialized Master in Innovation by Design (Mastère spécialisé Innovation by design)
- Postgraduate diploma in New Design (Post-diplôme Nouveau design)

ENSCI–Les Ateliers is also one of the seven partner schools that deliver the Master of European Design degree.

== Alumni ==
- Matali Crasset
- Florence Doléac
- Saran Diakité Kaba
- Jean-Louis Frechin
- Yannick Grannec
- Thierry Gaugain
- Rip Hopkins
- Patrick Jouin
- Mathieu Lehanneur
- Philippe Malouin
- Laurent Massaloux
- Jean-Marie Massaud
- Édith Meusnier
- Inga Sempé
- Seo Eunkyo
- Constance Guisset
- Flavien Berger
- Théo Mercier
- Cécile Canel
- Jacques Averna
