= HESAM University Group =

Cluster of several higher education institutions in the region of Lyon, France

HESAM University
- Hautes Écoles Sorbonne Arts et Métiers Université
- Type: Public
- Established: 2015
- President: Michel Terré
- Administrative staff: 2,000
- Students: 110,000
- Location: Paris, France; 48.8468033°N 2.3397563°E
- Campus: Multiple campuses
- Website: www.hesam.eu

The Hautes Écoles Sorbonne Arts et Métiers University or HESAM University (French: Hautes Écoles Sorbonne Arts et Métiers Université), located in Paris and in multiple campuses in France, is a center for higher education and research as a group of universities and institutions comprising 11 members and 4 associated institutions.

== Members ==
- École nationale supérieure des arts et métiers (Arts et Métiers)
- Conservatoire national des arts et métiers (CNAM)
- Centre des études supérieures industrielles (CESI)
- École Boulle
- École Duperré
- École Estienne
- École nationale supérieure des arts appliqués et des métiers d'art (ENSAAMA)
- École nationale supérieure d'architecture de Paris-La Villette (ENSAPLV)
- École nationale supérieure de création industrielle (ENSCI - Les Ateliers)
- Institut Français de la Mode (IFM)
- Paris School of Business (PSB)

== Associated institutions ==
- Centre de formation des journalistes de Paris (CFJ)
- Fondation Nationale Entreprise et Performance (FNEP)
- France Clusters
- Les Compagnons du Devoir

== See also ==
- CROUS
