= Lucien Rouzet =

French inventor (1886–1948)

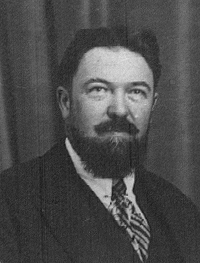
- Born: 23 March 1886; Dieuze, France
- Died: 4 March 1948 (aged 61)
- Education: Conservatoire National des Arts et Métiers
- Known for: Wireless telegraph system
- Scientific career
- Fields: Physicist, electrical engineer, inventor

Lucien Rouzet (23 March 1886 – 4 March 1948) was a French physicist and inventor, who, in 1912, created a wireless telegraph system.

== Biography ==
Born on 23 March 1886 in Dieuze, a town situated in a part of France occupied by the Prussians since 1871, Rouzet moved to the Paris area as soon as he could. His first step was to have his French citizenship made official through the "reinstatement process" (needed in his case in those days).

He started his professional life as an apprentice in different companies exploring various technologies. During the same period, he attended evening classes at the Conservatoire National des Arts et Métiers (National Conservatory of Arts and Crafts), and some time later he sat for a diploma at the Ecole des Travaux Publics (School of Public Works), which he obtained as an electrical engineer.

During World War II, from 1 November 1941 to 30 September 1944, he acted as an occasional agent for the Forces Françaises Combattantes (French fighting forces) in the CND-Castile Network, under the command of Colonel Rémy. After the war, he brought his expertise as vice president to the Centre d'Etudes de la Résistance (Studies of the Resistance Center) in the town of Clichy-la-Garenne.

Rouzet died on 4 March 1948.

== Discoveries and inventions ==
Rouzet invented the logarithmical variable condenser.

After his military service as a telegrapher, he reenlisted, contributing his most important invention, a wireless telegraph system allowing aircraft communications at unequalled distances at that time. The invention played a major part during World War I.

Fond of music, he studied the tuning principles of instruments, and, using as a basis Mercadier's and Marie Alfred Cornu's experiments on the relationship between the frequencies of fundamental chords, he developed a theory called rational scale, which took into account the different "colours" of a single theme played in different keys.

This theory was awarded a prize by the Académie Nationale de Metz (National Academy of Metz), a member of which he became, and by the "Société d'Encouragement pour l'Industrie Nationale" (Society of Encouragement for National Industry). But the supporters of the simple chromatic scale remained unconvinced, and their theory was maintained.

Unsatisfied with the principles that were considered the basis of thermodynamics, he devoted himself to the study of that field of physics and brought forward a theory based on other new grounds, to give better explanations for some physical and chemical phenomena. His theory was short-lived. Nevertheless, he carried on with more exhaustive researches in that field where he obtained major developments. After his death, the theory was presented to the CNRS (French National Center for Scientific Research), "who recognized the relevance of it", but said that "the principles taught at present, as imperfect as they may be, were sufficient practically speaking."

== History of the Rouzet TSF (wireless telegraph system) ==
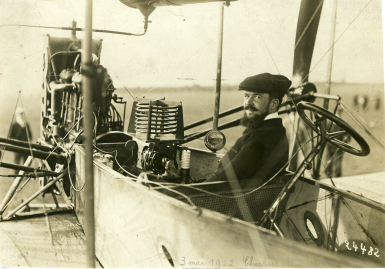
Lucien Rouzet at his transmitting station on board the test aeroplane on 3 May 1912 in Chartres

In the early years of the 20th century, radio connections, which used Morse Code, were only land transmissions. The techniques to amplify signals upon reception were still unknown, so the maximum distance at which messages could be detected depended entirely upon the transmitter's power.

In the military field, General Ferrié had a major communication network built, but the transmitting stations were too heavy to be carried aboard aeroplanes. Therefore, engineers tried to minimise the weight-to-power ratio, and short-distance connections between planes and the ground became possible.

Among those engineers was Rouzet, who developed a system that proved to be extremely efficient, as revealed during a test flight lasting nearly one hour at an altitude of more than 1,000 metres (3,300 ft) on 7 May 1912. Journalists were present, and articles reported the test and its results in French and foreign newspapers.

Rouzet then filed for patents in France and many other countries (with, not surprisingly, much difficulty in Germany, who was France's enemy at the time). The Société Industrielle de TSF et d'électricité (Industrial Society of Wireless Telegraph and Electricity) was set up to operate the invention, and devices were supplied to several countries (except Germany).

The French army, however, demanded an official comparative test with the other systems. In May 1914, on a single circuit over Blois and the Sarthe region, the test was carried out, with reception at Villacoublay. The signals broadcast by the aeroplane carrying the Rouzet system were the only ones received unbroken. The military demanded another test, but war was on its way, and the test was not carried out. As a result, the French air squadrons had no wireless telegraph.

However, the Rouzet system was used by the allied forces. The British Admiralty mandated its use; a letter signed by Post Captain Navy Attaché to the Embassy of England on 23 January 1915 reads:

I am authorised by the Admiralty to inform you that the satisfactory results achieved so far can be attributed for a large part to the devices manufactured by your Establishment. (Note: Original: Je suis autorisé par l'Amirauté de vous faire connaître que les résultats satisfaisants obtenus jusqu'ici, peuvent être attribués dans une grande mesure aux appareils fabriqués par votre Maison.)

Later, the French Navy made widespread use of those devices for active observation of maritime aviation ranging more than 250 kilometres (160 mi) away.

On land, Rouzet, from the top of the Eiffel Tower, was able to set up communications to even greater distances.

When the "lamp" for the amplification of signals on reception was perfected, interest was lost in Rouzet's system, and the operating company ceased activity, putting an end to the important contribution of Lucien Rouzet to the radio communication network initiated by General Ferrié.

On that occasion, Rouzet was offered a silver cup, engraved in French with the salutation: "Tribute from the Board of Directors of the TSF and Electricity Industrial Company to their engineer, Lucien Rouzet, inventor of the first wireless telegraph system for aeroplanes." (Note: Original: Hommage du Conseil d'Administration de la Société Industrielle de TSF et d'électricité à son ingénieur Lucien Rouzet, inventeur du premier système de TSF applicable aux aéroplanes.)
