= Théo Mercier =

French sculptor, painter and photographer

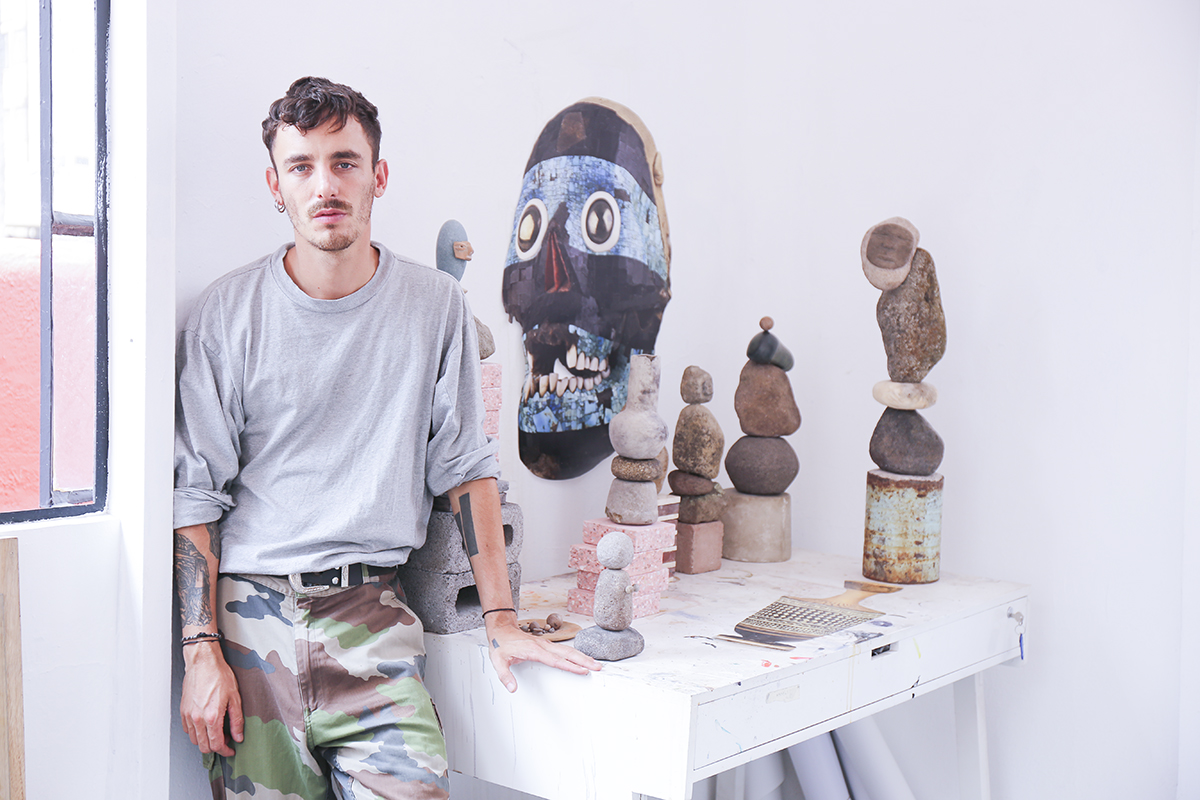
- Théo Mercier in 2017
- Born: 1984 (age 41–42)
- Occupations: Sculptor, painter and photographer

Théo Mercier (born 1984) is a French sculptor, painter and photographer.

== Training and Works ==
He is trained as a designer and self-taught as an artist, and interned with Matthew Barney in 2008. He also worked with Bernhard Willhelm. He uses collage and found objects in his work. Vogue described his work as drawing "on a surreal and dreamlike imaginarium populated by singular, mysterious and often monstrous creatures." His work has been exhibited at the Galerie Gabrielle Maubrie and the Fondation d'entreprise Ricard in Paris, France and Lille 3000.
