= Activity-centered ergonomics =

Activity-centered ergonomics is ergomomics that focuses on the activity. It uses knowledge from the physiology of labor, cognitive psychology and the psycho-physiology, sociology of organizations. Ergonomic analysis of work (EAW) is the main tool of the activity-centered ergonomic intervention.

== Background ==
Following Maurice de Montmollin (philosopher and psychologist at the Sorbonne), the French distinguished generally two major trends in ergonomics:

- Ergonomics focuses on the activity, which emphasizes understanding the work situation as a whole, the demand analysis and framework intervention and the distinction between prescribed work and real work. This school is mainly present in the Francophone countries, Brazil and another form in Scandinavia.
- The ergonomics of the human factors, focusing on research results General (on the postures, rhythms, moods of work ...) and definition of standards. It is dominant in the United States and Japan.

== Definitions ==
Activity-centered ergonomics uses knowledge from the physiology of labor, cognitive psychology (memory attention, collection learning ...) and the psycho-physiology (alert, posture, working conditions ...), sociology of organizations (distribution of functions, organizations in the chain of command, the string functional, social psychology, linguistics, among others: in fact all sciences relating to man).

It is based on models of the work situation (especially that of Jacques Christol, Jacques Leplat and Gilbert De Terssac) that focus on the difference 'nature' between the task (project record, the field of virtual future) and activity (body – the brain of course) who takes positions and makes movements activates the controls, manages (consciously or not) thought processes, communicate with others, organizes his actions, etc..

The first feature of the analysis of this activity is that the operator "regulates" the activity, according to its external environment, its internal state (e.g. fatigue) to ensure maximum consistency of performance: accelerating the pace of work to catch up with the delay or face an emergency change procedure against poor results ...

The second dominant feature is the concept of compromise between the requirements of performance (explicitly or implicitly always present) and requirements related to compliance with the rules (Security of management, technical, administrative ...). The Observer of the work activity notes'always' that this compromise exists, and it is not built as would the organizations, focusing on the rule prescribed first. The reality is complex, as in everyday life, where we all respect the speed limit on the road ... unless we're afraid of missing our train, or arrive late to an urgent appointment ...

This "cognitive compromise" is also affected by aspects psychic s of activity, insofar as studies of psychological aspects of work, increasing show that the achievement of production requires more and more not only to compromise with the security (which is never written) but also with its afraid, its stress his emotions etc.. This compromise can be considered "room", without going on the field with operators in business, whether to make a machine, a workstation or a computer interface: the standards and rules are inadequate ever.

== Ergonomics analysis of work ==
Ergonomic analysis of work (EAW) is the main tool of the activity-centered ergonomic intervention. It can help to solve several problems related to working conditions or the design of tools and equipment.

- Aspects of health in work
  - On the physical health including the musculoskeletal disorder (MSD) affecting 12 to 14% of employees
  - On the mental health risks due to particular psycho-social (in stress) can cause anxiety-depressive syndromes (about 8% of employees)
- Aspects of performance
  - Improving productivity
  - Improving quality

=== EAW, an influenced analysis ===
==== EAW, a "located" analysis ====
It is with the demand analysis and hypothesis he has made during the pre-diagnosis that the ergonomist will be able to choose situations to consider:

- Ensure sufficient mastery of technical data concerning the work situation;
- Build reference tools for description and interpretation of data;
- Give himself a medium for demonstration and communication.

==== The different elements of influence on work ====
The work activity is influenced by a multitude of facets. The ergonomist must rely on these aspects and compare the actual work for generating insights relevant to the problems posed

- The technical process : These are views which focus on flows and processing steps of a product or information
- The tools and media : An analysis of the means available to employees to obtain or receive information and act on the process to better prepare some investigations
- The relationship between the variables of a device : In explanation with the operator or guidance, it is possible that reflected different variables to the settings or status of the device technology (e.g. quality). It is then possible to relate with each other.
- Procedures : The sequences of a process as provided corresponds only very rarely that transactions made by employees.
- Dependencies and stops time : The work activity may enroll in a timeframe more or less structured by the process, by advancing the work of other employees, or by events outside the company.
- The layout of the technical device : Often, initial plans of arrangement are now outdated. Indeed, subsequent implementations of equipment have been made.

==== choice of the situations to analyze ====
It is rather difficult to extract a maxim or a rule in the choose of a situation that the ergonomist will do. The criteria he will use depending on the problem and the structure of the company. But it may be, for example, situations:

- Where complaints are most numerous
- Where the consequences are more serious
- Where the range of problems is the widest
- Playing a central role in the functioning of the company
- To be processing more or less long term

=== Analysis by the activity ===
At first glance, each is tempted by the establishment of relations of direct causation between working conditions and health consequences or effectiveness. A noisy situation makes deaf, carrying heavy loads of produce musculoskeletal disorder, bad lighting, eyestrain, etc.. Unfortunately, this approach has important limitations: protection against noise may prohibit access to the machine, etc. ...

In fact, this approach neglects the fact that these relations necessarily pass through the activity of the employee. Indeed, it makes compromises with respect to constraints (it does not have them) to achieve the goals that are set and to limit the inconvenience caused by the tasks. For this reason, the ergonomist must focus its ergonomic analysis of work activity: it is in and by the activity of the operator in creating the effects of working conditions.

The role, in this context, analysis of the activity is not an evaluation (the workload for example) but the description and explanation of the mechanisms involved

=== The tools available to the ergonomist ===
==== The observation ====
The observation is a specific feature in the Ergonomic analysis of work compared to other methods. This is to focus on the work as directed, whereas other approaches rely on "representations". Observation can be carried out openly or by focusing on the collection of certain categories of information with specific goals (we call then systematic observation).

- Broad observables categories : Travel, The direction of regards, Communications, Postures, The actions taken or information, Comments on the technical system and context, The collective
- Technical statement, there exist a variety of techniques to conduct surveys. The choice is made by the ergonomist in the constraints and circumstances. We'll list them here: The statements manuals, Video recordings, The Activity Chronic, The Metrics

==== The verbalizations ====
To understand the activity, working conditions and their consequences, the verbalization of the employee is essential because: Activity can be reduced to what is observable; The comments and actions take place at one moment, we must re-situate more broadly; The consequences of the activity are not all apparent.

However, there are limits to the verbalization to be taken into account:

- The employee described the work and its consequences in terms of what it believes to be the goals and interests of the speaker;
- The routine operations or learning old are not always mentioned spontaneously;
- Some aspects of the activities lend themselves well to verbal expression.

== See also ==
- Ergonomics
- Usability
- Systems approach
