= Syllable (disambiguation) =

A syllable is a unit of organization for a sequence of speech sounds.

Syllable or Syllables may also refer to:

- Syllable (computing), a unit of information storage
- Syllable (operating system), an operating system based on AtheOS
- "Syllables" (song), by Eminem featuring Jay-Z, Dr. Dre, 50 Cent, Stat Quo, and Cashis

== See also ==
- Semi-syllable (disambiguation)
- Syllabic (disambiguation)
- Syllabary, a set of written symbols
- Slab (unit), a unit of information storage consisting of 12 bits
- Instruction syllable, the portion of a machine language instruction that specifies the operation to be performed
