= LVDC =

LVDC may refer to:

- Launch Vehicle Digital Computer
- Launch Vehicle Data Center, hosted at the Spacecraft Assembly and Checkout Building
- Las Vegas Design Center, showrooms on the bottom two floors of Building A of the World Market Center Las Vegas
- Low voltage direct current, a subset of direct current
- Low voltage dimming controller, such as a 0-10 V lighting control
