= Magnetic strip (disambiguation) =

Magnetic strip may refer to:

- Magnetic stripe card
- Magnetic strip in an NCR CRAM deck
- Magnetic strip in an IBM 2321 Data Cell magazine
