= Syllabic (disambiguation) =

Syllabic may refer to:

- Syllable, a unit of speech sound, considered the building block of words
  - Syllabic consonant, a consonant that forms the nucleus of a syllable
- Syllabary, writing system using symbols for syllables
- Abugida, writing system using symbols for consonant-vowel combinations (previously called syllabic and syllabic alphabet)
  - Canadian Aboriginal syllabics, a family of abugidas used to write a number of Aboriginal Canadian languages
- Syllabic octal, octal representation of 8-bit syllables or bytes
- Syllabic verse, poetry that has a certain number of syllables per line
- Syllabic text setting in music, in which each syllable is matched to a single note, as opposed to melismatic

== See also ==
- Syllable (disambiguation)
- Semi-syllable (disambiguation)
