= DSRR =

DSRR may refer to:

- Delta Southern Railroad
- Discovery, Search, Ranking and Return - the major components of Web search engines
- Dynamic scale right round - a software instruction in the Burroughs large systems instruction set
