= Rod memory =

Type of computer memory

Rod memory is one of the many variations on magnetic core memory that attempts to lower costs by automating its manufacturing. It was introduced by NCR in 1964 as part of the NCR 315 RMC computer, RMC for "rod memory computer". It was also used in their Century line.

Like many similar concepts, notably twistor memory and thin-film memory, rod memory was competing for the role of taking over from core when the first semiconductor memory systems wiped out the entire market in 1970.

== Description ==
Rod memory was developed as a way to build memory systems equivalent to core memory more cheaply and easily.

Instead of magnetic rings used in core memory, rod memory uses magnetic bars surrounded by a metal coil. In contrast with core, where the electrical current runs linearly generating a magnetic field around the core, in rod memory the current runs around the solenoid and the magnetic field is linear in the rod. The end result is essentially the same, however, with the bits being represented by the direction of the magnetic field in the rod. To do this, the rods are placed in the middle of tiny solenoids, which produce a linear field in one direction or the other depending on which direction the current is flowing. The sense/inhibit line is constructed by winding the rod itself in a separate wire coil. This two-wire linear select mode of operation has inherent drawbacks in the way memory can be accessed, which is generally solved with slightly more complex input/output circuitry.

The bars were formed by electroplating a 97% iron/3% nickel plate onto beryllium-copper wire 10 thousandth of an inch in diameter (10 mils), coating it in polyurethane, and curing it in an oven. The long length of coated wire is then wound with thin copper ribbon, 10 mil wide and 2.5 mil thick, coated in urethane again, and then cut into 6-inch long bars. Separately, another machine is fed copper wire and periodically creates small coils of ten windings forming a solenoid. The assembly machinery then left a short section of the wire unbent, before winding another solenoid into the wire, and so on. The result is a string of coils on the wire, which from a distance looked like a series of knots evenly spaced along a rope. A number of these ropes were then laid parallel to each other and a second set of straight wires ran parallel to the ropes so they lay under one end of the solenoids. The assembly is then completed by inserting one of the rods through a series of solenoids and of the potting the entire assembly. The result is a single plane of memory, which is then assembled into a larger frame to form a complete memory with multiple bit planes.

== Assembly ==
For assembly, the rods were inserted into a plastic alignment sheet which was wound with read, write, and sense wire coils arranged in columns and rows. To get the rods to stand up straight on the sheet (so that they would drop into the coils for assembly) a large electro-magnet was turned on and made the rods stand up and "dance" into the individual holes. The economy of machine assembly was augmented by selling rod memory without paying patent royalties on core memory to NCR's competitor, IBM.
