= Semi-syllable =

Semi-syllable may refer to:

- minor syllable, in phonology
- a glyph of a semi-syllabary, in orthography

== See also ==
- Syllable (disambiguation)
- Syllabic (disambiguation)
