= Octal =

Base-8 numeral representation

Numeral systems, bits and Gray code
hex	dec	oct	3	2	1	0	step
0_{hex}	0_{dec}	0_{oct}	0	0	0	0	0
1_{hex}	1_{dec}	1_{oct}	0	0	0	1	1
2_{hex}	2_{dec}	2_{oct}	0	0	1	0	3
3_{hex}	3_{dec}	3_{oct}	0	0	1	1	2
4_{hex}	4_{dec}	4_{oct}	0	1	0	0	7
5_{hex}	5_{dec}	5_{oct}	0	1	0	1	6
6_{hex}	6_{dec}	6_{oct}	0	1	1	0	4
7_{hex}	7_{dec}	7_{oct}	0	1	1	1	5
8_{hex}	8_{dec}	10_{oct}	1	0	0	0	F
9_{hex}	9_{dec}	11_{oct}	1	0	0	1	E
A_{hex}	10_{dec}	12_{oct}	1	0	1	0	C
B_{hex}	11_{dec}	13_{oct}	1	0	1	1	D
C_{hex}	12_{dec}	14_{oct}	1	1	0	0	8
D_{hex}	13_{dec}	15_{oct}	1	1	0	1	9
E_{hex}	14_{dec}	16_{oct}	1	1	1	0	B
F_{hex}	15_{dec}	17_{oct}	1	1	1	1	A

Octal is a numeral system for representing a numeric value as base 8. Generally, an octal digit is represented as "0" to "7" with the same value as for decimal but with each place a power of 8. For example:

$$\mathbf{112}_8 = \mathbf{1} \times  8^2 + \mathbf{1} \times  8^1 + \mathbf{2} \times  8^0$$

In decimal, each place is a power of ten. For example:

$$\mathbf{74}_{10} = \mathbf{7} \times 10^1 + \mathbf{4} \times 10^0$$

An octal digit can represent the value of a 3-digit binary number (starting from the right). For example, the binary representation for decimal 74 is 1001010. Two zeroes can be added at the left: (00)1 001 010, corresponding to the octal digits 1 1 2, yielding the octal representation 112.

== Multiplication table ==
The octal multiplication table
×	1	2	3	4	5	6	7	10
1	1	2	3	4	5	6	7	10
2	2	4	6	10	12	14	16	20
3	3	6	11	14	17	22	25	30
4	4	10	14	20	24	30	34	40
5	5	12	17	24	31	36	43	50
6	6	14	22	30	36	44	52	60
7	7	16	25	34	43	52	61	70
10	10	20	30	40	50	60	70	100

== Usage ==
=== In China ===
Fuxi's "Earlier Heaven" Arrangement of the Eight Trigrams

The eight bagua or trigrams of the I Ching correspond to octal digits:

- 0 = ☷, 1 = ☳, 2 = ☵, 3 = ☱,
- 4 = ☶, 5 = ☲, 6 = ☴, 7 = ☰.

Gottfried Wilhelm Leibniz made the connection between trigrams, hexagrams and binary numbers in 1703.

=== By Native Americans ===
- The Yuki language in California has an octal system because the speakers count using the spaces between their fingers rather than the fingers themselves.
- The Pamean languages in Mexico also have an octal system, because some of their speakers "count the knuckles of the closed fist for each hand (excluding the thumb), so that two hands equals eight."

=== By Europeans ===
- It has been suggested that the reconstructed Proto-Indo-European (PIE) word for "nine" might be related to the PIE word for "new". Based on this, some have speculated that proto-Indo-Europeans used an octal number system, though the evidence supporting this is slim.
- In 1668, John Wilkins in An Essay towards a Real Character, and a Philosophical Language proposed use of base 8 instead of 10 "because the way of Dichotomy or Bipartition being the most natural and easie kind of Division, that Number is capable of this down to an Unite".
- In 1716, King Charles XII of Sweden asked Emanuel Swedenborg to elaborate a number system based on 64 instead of 10. Swedenborg argued, however, that for people with less intelligence than the king such a big base would be too difficult and instead proposed 8 as the base. In 1718 Swedenborg wrote (but did not publish) a manuscript: "En ny rekenkonst som om vexlas wid Thalet 8 i stelle then wanliga wid Thalet 10" ("A new arithmetic (or art of counting) which changes at the Number 8 instead of the usual at the Number 10"). The numbers 1–7 are there denoted by the consonants l, s, n, m, t, f, u (v) and zero by the vowel o. Thus 8 = "lo", 16 = "so", 24 = "no", 64 = "loo", 512 = "looo" etc. Numbers with consecutive consonants are pronounced with vowel sounds between in accordance with a special rule.
- Writing under the pseudonym "Hirossa Ap-Iccim" in The Gentleman's Magazine, (London) July 1745, Hugh Jones proposed an octal system for British coins, weights and measures. "Whereas reason and convenience indicate to us an uniform standard for all quantities; which I shall call the Georgian standard; and that is only to divide every integer in each species into eight equal parts, and every part again into 8 real or imaginary particles, as far as is necessary. For tho' all nations count universally by tens (originally occasioned by the number of digits on both hands) yet 8 is a far more complete and commodious number; since it is divisible into halves, quarters, and half quarters (or units) without a fraction, of which subdivision ten is uncapable...." In a later treatise on Octave computation (1753) Jones concluded: "Arithmetic by Octaves seems most agreeable to the Nature of Things, and therefore may be called Natural Arithmetic in Opposition to that now in Use, by Decades; which may be esteemed Artificial Arithmetic."
- In 1801, James Anderson criticized the French for basing the metric system on decimal arithmetic. He suggested base 8, for which he coined the term octal. His work was intended as recreational mathematics, but he suggested a purely octal system of weights and measures and observed that the existing system of English units was already, to a remarkable extent, an octal system.
- In the mid-19th century, Alfred B. Taylor concluded that "Our octonary [base 8] radix is, therefore, beyond all comparison the "best possible one" for an arithmetical system." The proposal included a graphical notation for the digits and new names for the numbers, suggesting that we should count "un, du, the, fo, pa, se, ki, unty, unty-un, unty-du" and so on, with successive multiples of eight named "unty, duty, thety, foty, paty, sety, kity and under." So, for example, the number 65 (101 in octal) would be spoken in octonary as under-un. Taylor also republished some of Swedenborg's work on octal as an appendix to the above-cited publications.

=== In computers ===
Octal became widely used in computing when systems such as the UNIVAC 1050, PDP-8, ICL 1900 and IBM mainframes employed 6-bit, 12-bit, 24-bit or 36-bit words. Octal was an ideal abbreviation of binary for these machines because their word size is divisible by three (each octal digit represents three binary digits). So two, four, eight or twelve digits could concisely display an entire machine word. It also cut costs by allowing Nixie tubes, seven-segment displays, and calculators to be used for the operator consoles, where binary displays were too complex to use, decimal displays needed complex hardware to convert radices, and hexadecimal displays needed to display more numerals.

All modern computing platforms, however, use 16-, 32-, or 64-bit words, further divided into eight-bit bytes. On such systems three octal digits per byte would be required, with the most significant octal digit representing two binary digits (plus one bit of the next significant byte, if any). Octal representation of a 16-bit word requires 6 digits, but the most significant octal digit represents (quite inelegantly) only one bit (0 or 1). This representation offers no way to easily read the most significant byte, because it is smeared over four octal digits. Therefore, hexadecimal is more commonly used in programming languages today, since two hexadecimal digits exactly specify one byte. Some platforms with a power-of-two word size still have instruction subwords that are more easily understood if displayed in octal; this includes the PDP-11 and Motorola 68000 family. The modern-day ubiquitous x86 architecture belongs to this category as well, but octal is rarely used on this platform, although certain properties of the binary encoding of opcodes become more readily apparent when displayed in octal, e.g. the ModRM byte, which is divided into fields of 2, 3, and 3 bits, so octal can be useful in describing these encodings. Before the availability of assemblers, some programmers would handcode programs in octal; for instance, Dick Whipple and John Arnold wrote Tiny BASIC Extended directly in machine code, using octal.

Octal is sometimes used in computing instead of hexadecimal, perhaps most often in modern times in conjunction with file permissions under Unix systems (see chmod). It has the advantage of not requiring any extra symbols as digits (the hexadecimal system is base-16 and therefore needs six additional symbols beyond 0–9).

In programming languages, octal literals are typically identified with a variety of prefixes, including the digit 0, the letters o or q, the digit–letter combination 0o, or the symbol & or $. In Motorola convention, octal numbers are prefixed with @, whereas a small (or capital) letter o or q is added as a postfix following the Intel convention. In Concurrent DOS, Multiuser DOS and REAL/32 as well as in DOS Plus and DR-DOS various environment variables like $CLS, $ON, $OFF, $HEADER or $FOOTER support an \nnn octal number notation, and DR-DOS DEBUG utilizes \ to prefix octal numbers as well.

For example, the literal 73 (base 8) might be represented as 073, o73, q73, 0o73, \73, @73, &73, $73 or 73o in various languages.

Newer languages have been abandoning the prefix 0, as decimal numbers are often represented with leading zeroes. The prefix q was introduced to avoid the prefix o being mistaken for a zero, while the prefix 0o was introduced to avoid starting a numerical literal with an alphabetic character (like o or q), since these might cause the literal to be confused with a variable name. The prefix 0o also follows the model set by the prefix 0x used for hexadecimal literals in the C language; it is supported by Haskell, OCaml, Python as of version 3.0, Raku, Ruby, Tcl as of version 9, PHP as of version 8.1, Rust and ECMAScript as of ECMAScript 6 (the prefix 0 originally stood for base 8 in JavaScript but could cause confusion, therefore it has been discouraged in ECMAScript 3 and dropped in ECMAScript 5).

Octal numbers that are used in some programming languages (C, Perl, PostScript...) for textual/graphical representations of byte strings when some byte values (unrepresented in a code page, non-graphical, having special meaning in current context or otherwise undesired) have to be to escaped as \nnn. Octal representation may be particularly handy with non-ASCII bytes of UTF-8, which encodes groups of 6 bits, and where any start byte has octal value \3nn and any continuation byte has octal value \2nn.

Octal was also used for floating point in the Ferranti Atlas (1962), Burroughs B5500 (1964), Burroughs B5700 (1971), Burroughs B6700 (1971) and Burroughs B7700 (1972) computers.

=== In aviation ===
Transponders in aircraft transmit a "squawk" code, expressed as a four-octal-digit number, when interrogated by ground radar. This code is used to distinguish different aircraft on the radar screen.

== Conversion between bases ==
=== Decimal to octal conversion ===
==== Method of successive Euclidean division by 8 ====
To convert an integer written in decimal to octal, divide the original number by the largest possible power of 8 and divide the remainders by successively smaller powers of 8 until the power is 1. The octal representation is formed by the quotients, written in the order generated by the algorithm. For example, to convert 125_{10} to octal:

125 = 8^{2} × 1 + 61
61 = 8^{1} × 7 + 5
5 = 8^{0} × 5 + 0

Therefore, 125_{10} = 175_{8}.

Another example:

900 = 8^{3} × 1 + 388
388 = 8^{2} × 6 + 4
4 = 8^{1} × 0 + 4
4 = 8^{0} × 4 + 0

Therefore, 900_{10} = 1604_{8}.

==== Method of successive multiplication by 8 ====
To convert a decimal fraction to octal, multiply by 8; the integer part of the result is the first digit of the octal fraction. Repeat the process with the fractional part of the result, until it is null or within acceptable error bounds.

Example: Convert 0.1640625 to octal:

0.1640625 × 8 = 1.3125 = 1 + 0.3125
0.3125 × 8 = 2.5 = 2 + 0.5
0.5 × 8 = 4.0 = 4 + 0

Therefore, 0.1640625_{10} = 0.124_{8}.

These two methods can be combined to handle decimal numbers with both integer and fractional parts, using the first on the integer part and the second on the fractional part.

==== Method of successive duplication ====
To convert an integer written in decimal to octal, prefix the number with "0.". Perform the following steps for as long as digits remain on the right side of the radix: Double the value to the left side of the radix, using octal rules, move the radix point one digit rightward, and then place the doubled value underneath the current value so that the radix points align. If the moved radix point crosses over a digit that is 8 or 9, convert it to 0 or 1 and add the carry to the next leftward digit of the current value. Add octally those digits to the left of the radix and simply drop down those digits to the right, without modification.

Example:

 0.4 9 1 8 decimal value
  +0
 ---------
   4.9 1 8
  +1 0
  --------
   6 1.1 8
  +1 4 2
  --------
   7 5 3.8
  +1 7 2 6
  --------
 1 1 4 6 6. octal value

=== Octal to decimal conversion ===
To convert a number k to decimal, use the formula that defines its base-8 representation:

$$k = \sum_{i=0}^n \left( a_i\times 8^i \right)$$

In this formula, a_{i} is an individual octal digit being converted, where i is the position of the digit (counting from 0 for the right-most digit).

Example: Convert 764_{8} to decimal:

764_{8} = 7 × 8^{2} + 6 × 8^{1} + 4 × 8^{0} = 448 + 48 + 4 = 500_{10}

For double-digit octal numbers this method amounts to multiplying the lead digit by 8 and adding the second digit to get the total.

Example: 65_{8} = 6 × 8 + 5 = 53_{10}

==== Method of successive duplication ====
To convert octals to decimals, prefix the number with "0.". Perform the following steps for as long as digits remain on the right side of the radix: Double the value to the left side of the radix, using decimal rules, move the radix point one digit rightward, and then place the doubled value underneath the current value so that the radix points align. Subtract decimally those digits to the left of the radix and simply drop down those digits to the right, without modification.

Example:

 0.1 1 4 6 6  octal value
  -0
 -----------
   1.1 4 6 6
  -  2
  ----------
     9.4 6 6
  -  1 8
  ----------
     7 6.6 6
  -  1 5 2
  ----------
     6 1 4.6
  -  1 2 2 8
  ----------
     4 9 1 8. decimal value

=== Octal to binary conversion ===
To convert octal to binary, replace each octal digit by its binary representation.

Example: Convert 51_{8} to binary:

5_{8} = 101_{2}
1_{8} = 001_{2}

Therefore, 51_{8} = 101 001_{2}.

=== Binary to octal conversion ===
The process is the reverse of the previous algorithm. The binary digits are grouped by threes, starting from the least significant bit and proceeding to the left and to the right. Add leading zeroes (or trailing zeroes to the right of decimal point) to fill out the last group of three if necessary. Then replace each trio with the equivalent octal digit.

For instance, convert binary 1010111100 to octal:

001	010	111	100
1	2	7	4

Therefore, 1010111100_{2} = 1274_{8}.

Convert binary 11100.01001 to octal:

011	100	.	010	010
3	4	.	2	2

Therefore, 11100.01001_{2} = 34.22_{8}.

=== Octal to hexadecimal conversion ===
The conversion is made in two steps using binary as an intermediate base. Octal is converted to binary and then binary to hexadecimal, grouping digits by fours, which correspond each to a hexadecimal digit.

For instance, convert octal 1057 to hexadecimal:

To binary:

1	0	5	7
001	000	101	111

then to hexadecimal:

0010	0010	1111
2	2	F

Therefore, 1057_{8} = 22F_{16}.

=== Hexadecimal to octal conversion ===
Hexadecimal to octal conversion proceeds by first converting the hexadecimal digits to 4-bit binary values, then regrouping the binary bits into 3-bit octal digits.

For example, to convert 3FA5_{16}:

To binary:

3	F	A	5
0011	1111	1010	0101

then to octal:

0	011	111	110	100	101
0	3	7	6	4	5

Therefore, 3FA5_{16} = 37645_{8}.

== Real numbers ==
=== Fractions ===
As with all numeral systems that have a base of a power of two, almost all octal fractions have repeating digits, with the sole exceptions being those where the denominator is itself a power of two.

Decimal base Prime factors of the base: 2, 5 Prime factors of one below the base: 3 Prime factors of one above the base: 11; Other Prime factors: 7 13 17 19 23 29 31			Octal base Prime factors of the base: 2 Prime factors of one below the base: 7 Prime factors of one above the base: 3 Other Prime factors: 5 13 15 21 23 27 35 37		
Fraction	Prime factors of the denominator	Positional representation	Positional representation	Prime factors of the denominator	Fraction
1/2	2	0.5	0.4	2	1/2
1/3	3	0.3333... = 0.3̅	0.2525... = 0.2̅5̅	3	1/3
1/4	2	0.25	0.2	2	1/4
1/5	5	0.2	0.1̅4̅6̅3̅	5	1/5
1/6	2, 3	0.16̅	0.12̅5̅	2, 3	1/6
1/7	7	0.1̅4̅2̅8̅5̅7̅	0.1̅	7	1/7
1/8	2	0.125	0.1	2	1/10
1/9	3	0.1̅	0.0̅7̅	3	1/11
1/10	2, 5	0.1	0.06̅3̅1̅4̅	2, 5	1/12
1/11	11	0.0̅9̅	0.0̅5̅6̅4̅2̅7̅2̅1̅3̅5̅	13	1/13
1/12	2, 3	0.083̅	0.05̅2̅	2, 3	1/14
1/13	13	0.0̅7̅6̅9̅2̅3̅	0.0̅4̅7̅3̅	15	1/15
1/14	2, 7	0.07̅1̅4̅2̅8̅5̅	0.04̅	2, 7	1/16
1/15	3, 5	0.06̅	0.0̅4̅2̅1̅	3, 5	1/17
1/16	2	0.0625	0.04	2	1/20
1/17	17	0.0̅5̅8̅8̅2̅3̅5̅2̅9̅4̅1̅1̅7̅6̅4̅7̅	0.0̅3̅6̅0̅7̅4̅1̅7̅	21	1/21
1/18	2, 3	0.05̅	0.03̅4̅	2, 3	1/22
1/19	19	0.0̅5̅2̅6̅3̅1̅5̅7̅8̅9̅4̅7̅3̅6̅8̅4̅2̅1̅	0.0̅3̅2̅7̅4̅5̅	23	1/23
1/20	2, 5	0.05	0.03̅1̅4̅6̅	2, 5	1/24
1/21	3, 7	0.0̅4̅7̅6̅1̅9̅	0.0̅3̅	3, 7	1/25
1/22	2, 11	0.04̅5̅	0.02̅7̅2̅1̅3̅5̅0̅5̅6̅4̅	2, 13	1/26
1/23	23	0.0̅4̅3̅4̅7̅8̅2̅6̅0̅8̅6̅9̅5̅6̅5̅2̅1̅7̅3̅9̅1̅3̅	0.0̅2̅6̅2̅0̅5̅4̅4̅1̅3̅1̅	27	1/27
1/24	2, 3	0.0416̅	0.02̅5̅	2, 3	1/30
1/25	5	0.04	0.0̅2̅4̅3̅6̅5̅6̅0̅5̅0̅7̅5̅3̅4̅1̅2̅1̅7̅2̅7̅	5	1/31
1/26	2, 13	0.03̅8̅4̅6̅1̅5̅	0.02̅3̅5̅4̅	2, 15	1/32
1/27	3	0.0̅3̅7̅	0.0̅2̅2̅7̅5̅5̅	3	1/33
1/28	2, 7	0.035̅7̅1̅4̅2̅8̅	0.02̅	2, 7	1/34
1/29	29	0.0̅3̅4̅4̅8̅2̅7̅5̅8̅6̅2̅0̅6̅8̅9̅6̅5̅5̅1̅7̅2̅4̅1̅3̅7̅9̅3̅1̅	0.0̅2̅1̅5̅1̅7̅3̅4̅5̅4̅1̅0̅6̅4̅7̅5̅6̅2̅6̅0̅4̅3̅2̅3̅6̅7̅1̅3̅	35	1/35
1/30	2, 3, 5	0.03̅	0.02̅1̅0̅4̅	2, 3, 5	1/36
1/31	31	0.0̅3̅2̅2̅5̅8̅0̅6̅4̅5̅1̅6̅1̅2̅9̅	0.0̅2̅0̅4̅1̅	37	1/37
1/32	2	0.03125	0.02	2	1/40

=== Irrational numbers ===
The table below gives the expansions of some common irrational numbers in decimal and octal.

Number	Positional representation	
Number	Decimal	Octal
√2 (the length of the diagonal of a unit square)	1.414213562373095048...	1.3240 4746 3177 1674...
√3 (the length of the diagonal of a unit cube)	1.732050807568877293...	1.5666 3656 4130 2312...
√5 (the length of the diagonal of a 1×2 rectangle)	2.236067977499789696...	2.1706 7363 3457 7224...
φ (phi, the golden ratio = (1+√5)/2)	1.618033988749894848...	1.4743 3571 5627 7512...
π (pi, the ratio of circumference to diameter of a circle)	3.141592653589793238...	3.1103 7552 4210 2643...
e (the base of the natural logarithm)	2.718281828459045235...	2.5576 0521 3050 5355...

== See also ==
- Computer number format – Internal representation of numeric values in a digital computer
- Octal games, a game numbering system used in combinatorial game theory
- Split octal, a 16-bit octal notation used by the Heath Company, DEC and others
- Squawk code, a 12-bit octal representation of Gillham code
- Syllabic octal, an octal representation of 8-bit syllables used by English Electric
