= NCR CRAM =

Data storage device

Card Random Access Memory
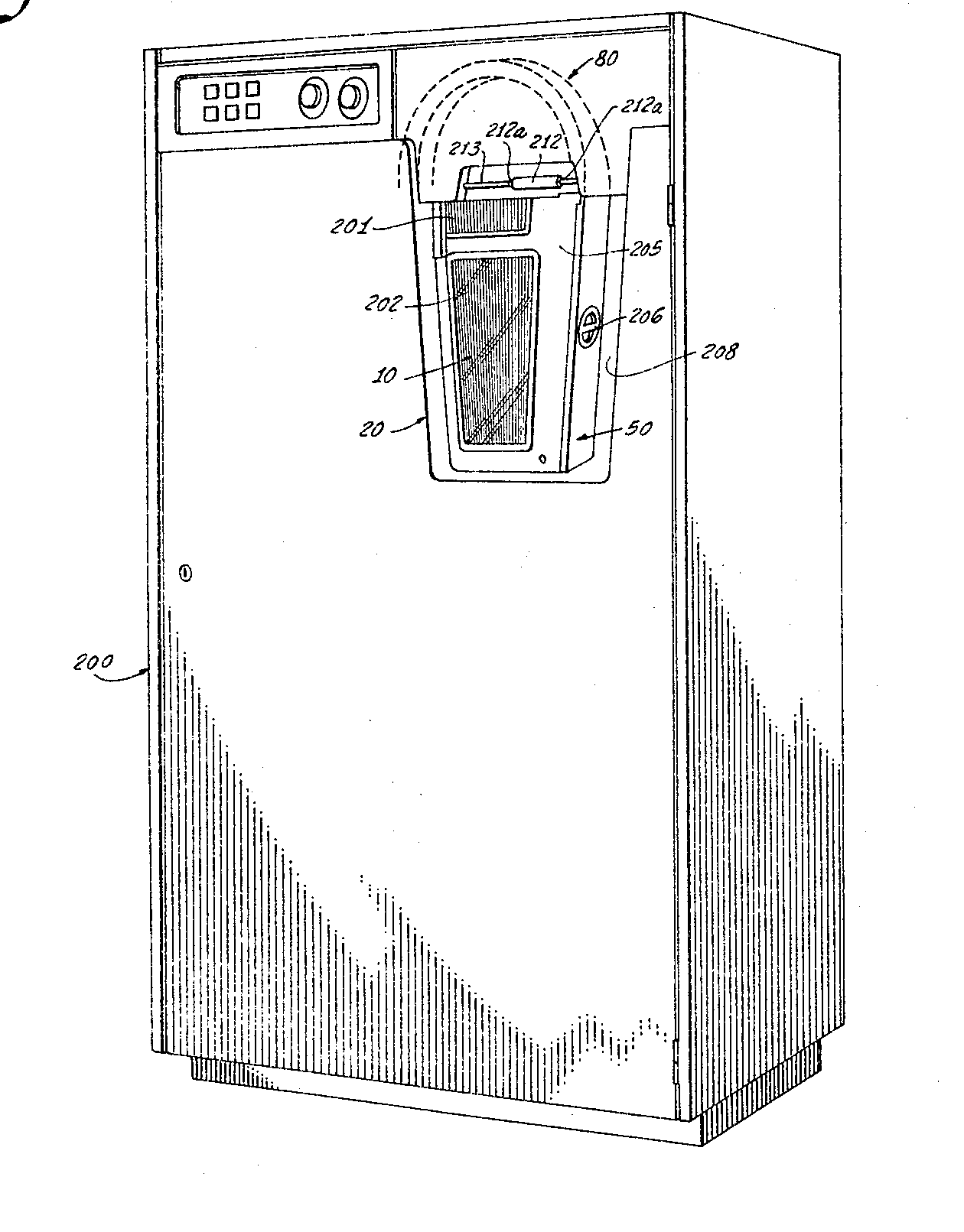
- Sketch of CRAM unit
- Also known as: CRAM
- Manufacturer: NCR Corporation
- Released: 1962

CRAM, or Card Random-Access Memory, model 353-1, was a data storage device invented by NCR, which first appeared on their model NCR-315 mainframe computer in 1962. It was also available for NCR's third generation NCR Century series as the NCR/653-100.

The first CRAM units were deployed on NCR's 315 system. A second generation was deployed on the successor 615 or Century line of computers. CRAM was very successful in the 1960s, offering a fast and secure storage alternative to magnetic tape, but was superseded by the development of superior disk drive technology.

== Media ==
A CRAM cartridge contained 256 3x14 inch cards with a PET film magnetic recording surface. Each "deck" of cards could contain up to 5.5 MB of alphanumeric characters. The cards were suspended from eight d-section rods, which were selectively rotated to release a specific card, each card having a unique pattern of notches at one end. The selected card was dropped and wrapped around a rotating drum to be read or written. Each cartridge could store 5.5 MB.

Later versions of the CRAM, the 353-2 and 353-3, used decks of 512 cards, thus doubling the storage capacity of each unit.

Each card contains seven tracks containing 1550 slabs (12 bits each). Normally the track was initialized with a four slab header containing the cartridge number (two slabs), the card number and the track number.

== Operation ==
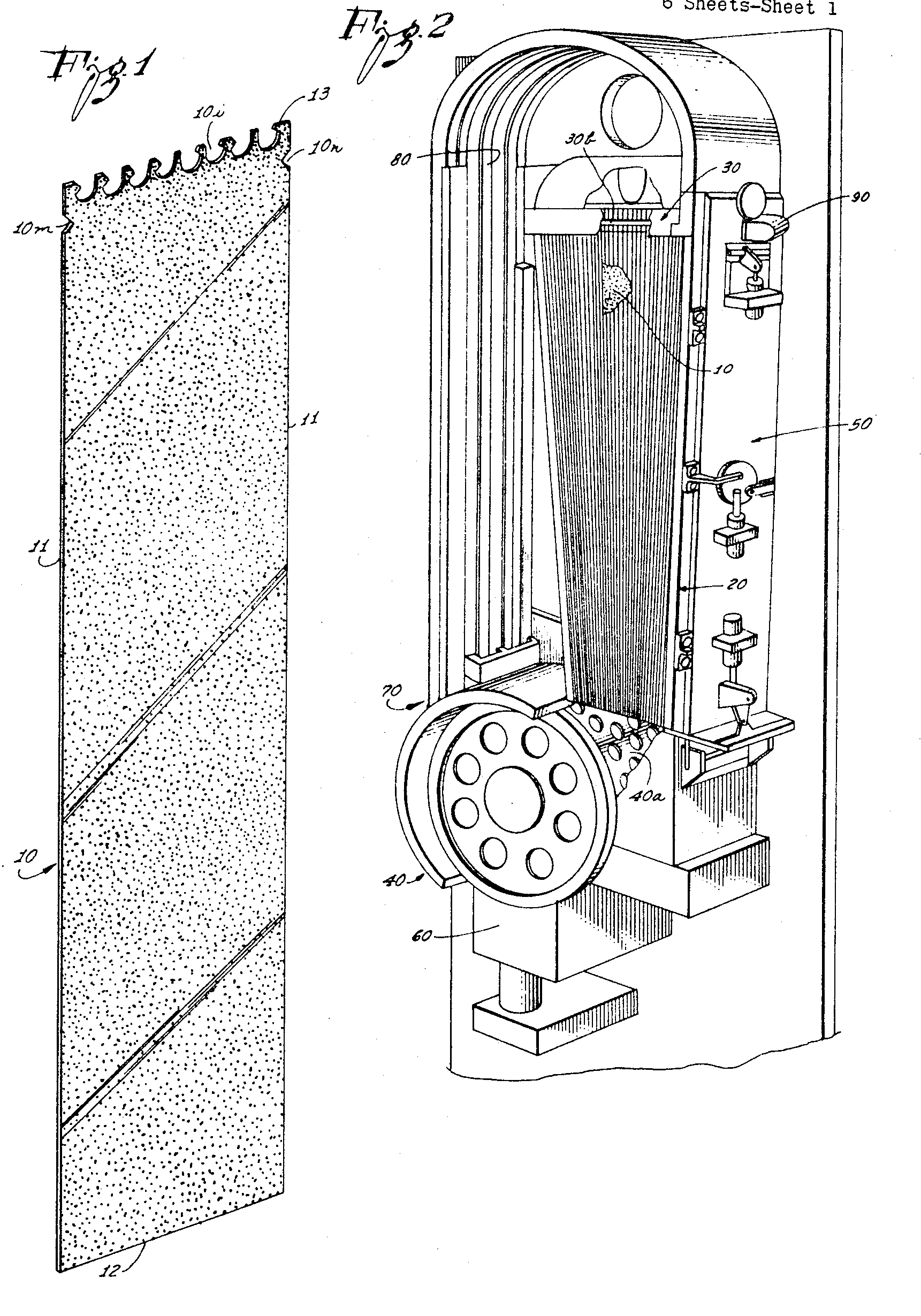
CRAM Mechanism

Cards were dropped by changing the card rods to a binary configuration and release the two outside "release" rods. Air was blown over the top of the cards to keep them separated, and to increase the dropping speed. Once on the rotating drum a series of positive and negative air pressure chambers pulled the card across a magnetic read-write head. After one or more passes over the head, where data is written to or read from the card, a release gate allow the card to be thrown along a raceway over the card deck, and onto a loader mechanism. The loader used a group of electro-magnetic solenoids to place the card back onto the control rods. The unit had two large electric motors that drove four large vacuum/blowers. It was possible to have up to five cards in motion at any point in time; one dropping, one on the drum, two in the return transport, and one being loaded back onto the deck.

If the card didn't succeed in dropping there was a "magic wand" similar to a pencil available to solve the problem.

The system had the potential for a "double drop", where two cards would drop at once, due to a break in a notch on one card, or, more commonly, a card being held by one rod being dislodged by the adjacent card dropping, usually cards 000 (the deck directory card) and 001 which resulted in the necessity of recreating the directory. This would result in a high pitched noise with which operators were very familiar and could hear even outside the computer room, and damage to the cards. These were called "screamers", while the opposite problem, cards that wouldn't drop, were called "hangers".

The order of the cards was not important because of the notch encoding system. Should an operator accidentally drop all the cards from a cartridge, they could be replaced without worrying about order.
