= Gemini Guidance Computer =

Digital computer designed for Project Gemini

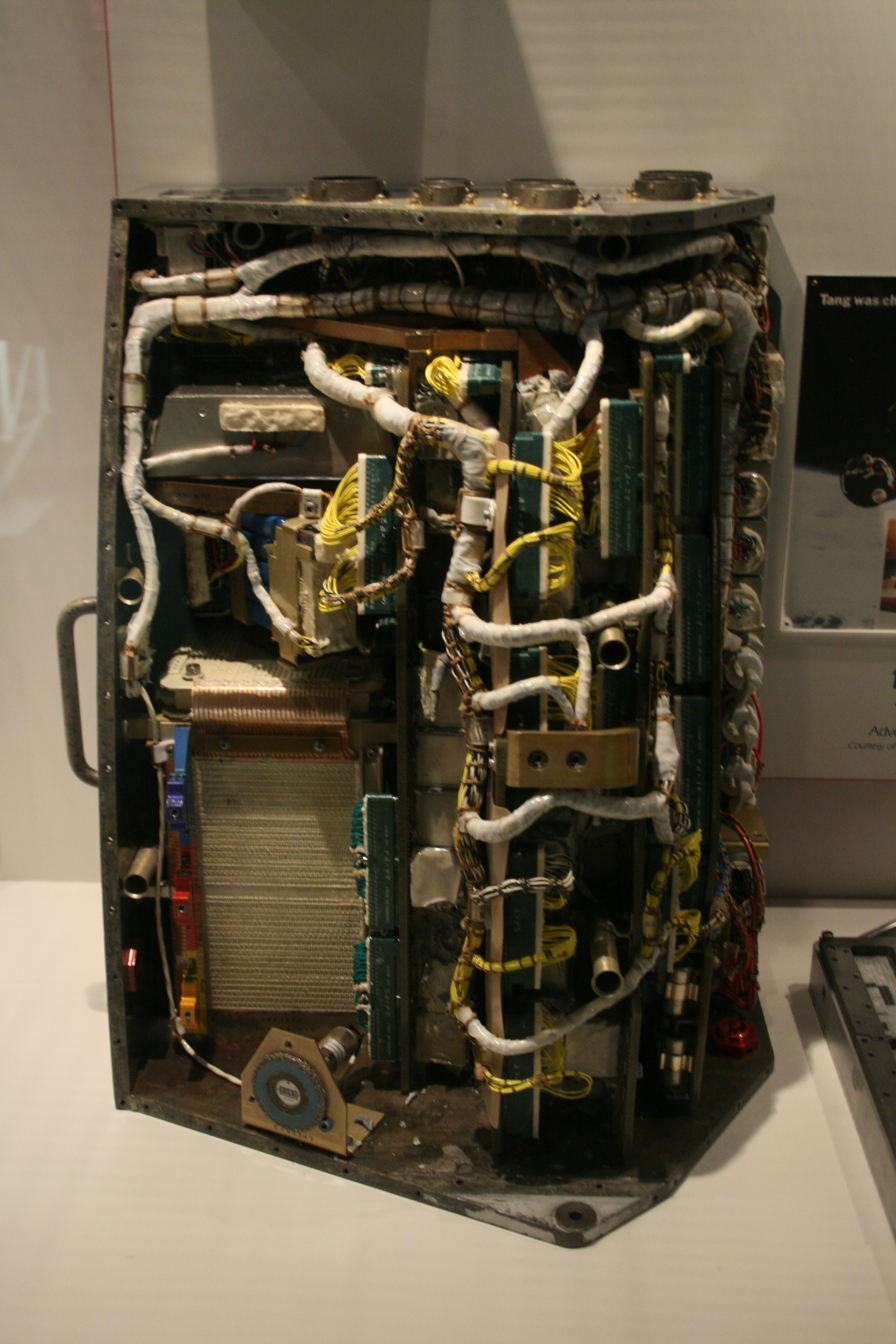
- Gemini Guidance Computer in National Air and Space Museum
- Invented by: IBM Federal Systems Division
- Manufacturer: IBM Federal Systems Division
- Introduced: 1965; 61 years ago
- Discontinued: 1966; 60 years ago
- Type: Avionics; Guidance Computer
- Processor: Discrete Components
- Frequency: 7.143 kilohertz clock
- Memory: 39-bit words memory, each composed of three 13-bit syllables, 4,096 words of memory, in a ferrite core array
- Ports: Modular Display Keyboard (MDK), Modular Display Readout (MDR), Attitude Control and Maneuver Electronics (ACME), Inertial Measurement Unit (IMU), Horizon Sensors, Time Reference System (TRS)
- Weight: 58.98 lb (26.75 kg)
- Dimensions: 18.9 in × 14.5 in × 12.75 in (48.0 cm × 36.8 cm × 32.4 cm) (H)×(W)×(D)

The Gemini Guidance Computer (sometimes Gemini Spacecraft On-Board Computer, OBC) was a digital, serial computer designed for Project Gemini, America's second human spaceflight project. The computer, which facilitated the control of mission maneuvers, was designed by the IBM Federal Systems Division.

== Functionality ==
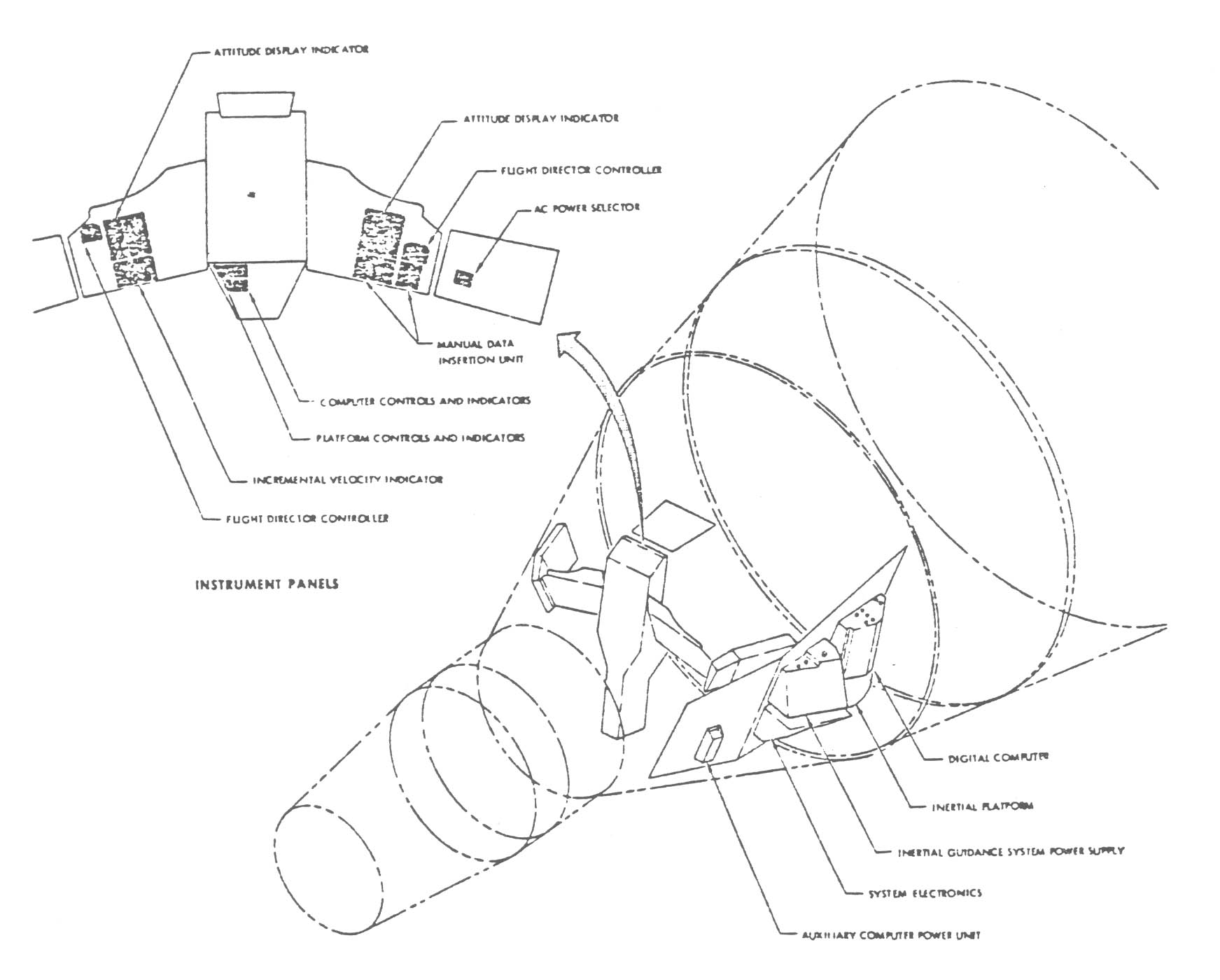
Locations of the Gemini Guidance System

Project Gemini was the first with an on-board computer, as Project Mercury was controlled by computers on Earth. The Gemini Guidance Computer was responsible for the following functions:

- Ascent – serves as a backup guidance system. The switchover is manually controlled by the astronauts
- Orbital flight – gives the astronauts the capacity to navigate, allowing them to choose a safe landing spot in an emergency and calculate the timing of retrofire (on extended missions ground data may become unavailable when ground data network rotates out of the orbital plane).
- Rendezvous – serves as primary reference by providing guidance information to the astronauts. The orbit parameters are determined by the ground tracking which are then sent to the spacecraft; the guidance computer was responsible for processing the information along with sensed spacecraft attitude. The information was presented to the astronauts in terms of spacecraft coordinates.
- Reentry – feeds commands directly to the reentry control system for automatic reentry or provides the guidance information to the astronauts for manual reentry.

== Specifications ==
- The computer was architecturally similar to the Saturn Launch Vehicle Digital Computer, in particular in the instruction set; however its circuit integration was less advanced. The GGC weighed 58.98 pounds (26.75 kg) and was powered by 28V DC. During a short power outage it could be powered by the Auxiliary Computer Power Unit (ACPU).
- 39-bit words memory, each composed of three 13-bit syllables
- Ferrite core memory of 4,096 words
- Two's complement integer arithmetic
- 7.143 kilohertz clock (140 μs per instruction); all instructions took a single cycle except for multiplication and division

== See also ==
- Apollo Guidance Computer
