= Spacecraft Assembly and Checkout Building =

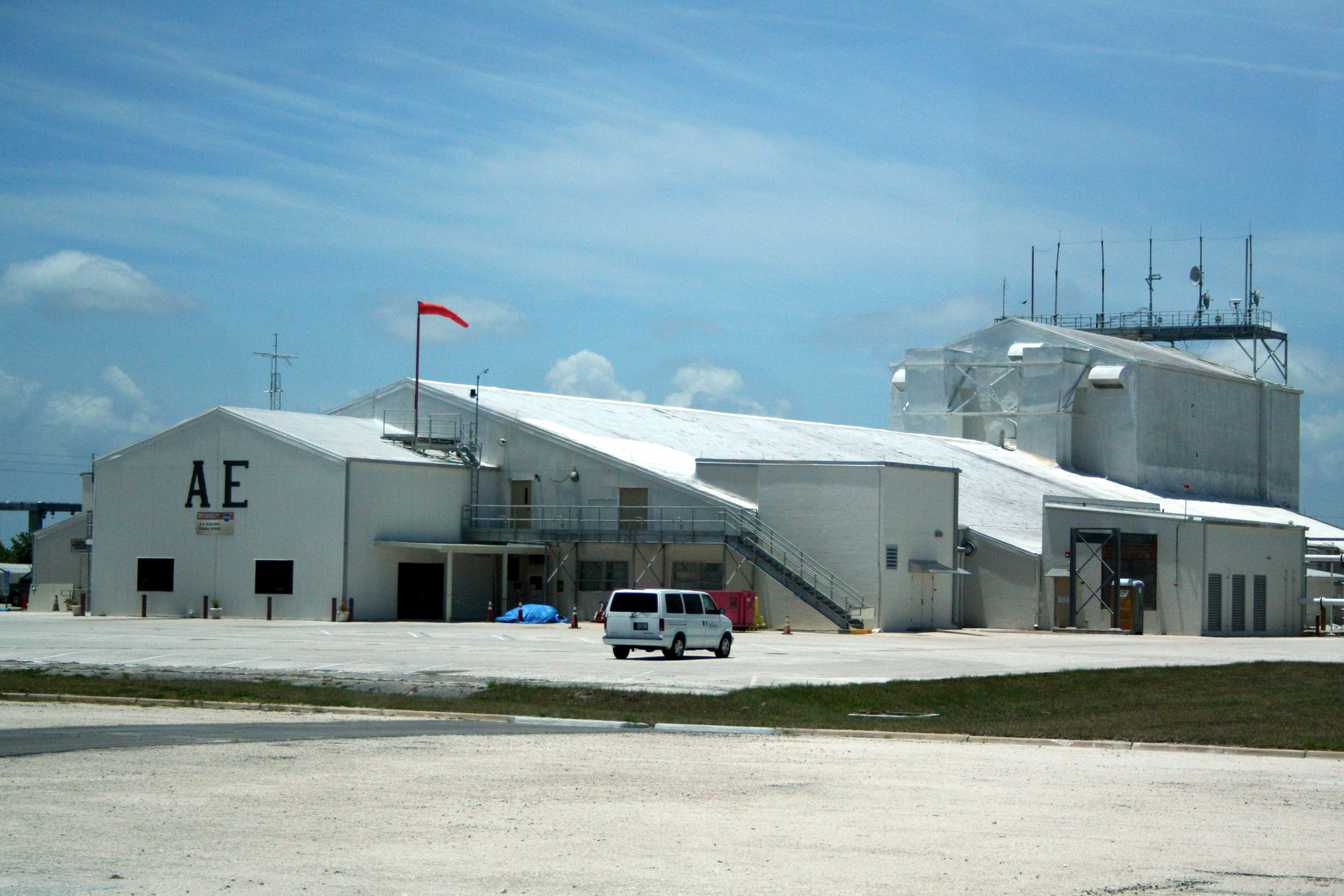
Spacecraft Assembly and Checkout Building

The Spacecraft Assembly and Checkout Building (formerly Hangar AE) was built in 1959 for a Department of Defense missile program. The facility was acquired in 1960 by NASA and modified for unmanned missions.

The building contains a Class 10K horizontal laminar flow clean room complex; a telemetry ground station; an extensive communications center for data, voice and video; three launch vehicle data centers (LVDC); the Mission Director's Center (MDC); and offices for payload and contractor personnel. The NASA Launch Services Program uses this facility as its communications center. The entire building is environmentally controlled. The Spacecraft Assembly and Checkout Building control rooms provide real-time voice, data and video information for expendable vehicle checkout and launch operations, similar to that provided by the Space Shuttle control rooms. Each console in the LVDC has a 40-channel voice instrument called a MOCS2 (Mission Operation Communication System version 2). Other areas have 24-channel versions of the MOCS2. Each console has access to an administrative telephone and a modem line for use with a laptop computer, if required.
