= NCR Century 100 =

1968 computer system

NCR Century 100 Logo

The NCR Century 100 was NCR's first all integrated circuit computer built in 1968. It was one model in a line of computers called the "Century" series (initially the 100, 200, and 300). All logic gates were created by wire-wrapping NAND gates together to form flip-flops and other complex circuits. The console of the system had only 18 lights and switches and allowed entry of a boot routine, or changes to loaded programs or data in memory. A typewriter console was also available.

== Peripherals ==
The 615-100 Series integrated a complete data processing system that had 16KB or 32KB of short-rod memory, an 80-column punched card reader or paper tape reader, two 5MB removable disk drives, and a 600-line-per-minute line printer. The system could be provided with a punched paper tape reader, or an external card reader/punch, and also allowed for the attachment of multiple 9-track, 1/2-inch, reel-to-reel magnetic tape drives. Two more disk drives could be attached to the system.

The Century series used an instruction set with two instruction lengths: four bytes (32 bits) and eight bytes (64 bits).

== Rod memory ==
The memory of the Century Series computers used machine-made, short, iron-oxide-coated ceramic rods— 1/16 inch (1.6 mm) long and approximately the diameter of a human hair— as their random access memories, instead of the hand-labor-intensive core memories that were used by other computers of the time. The economy of machine assembly was augmented by selling rod memory without paying patent royalties on core memory to NCR's competitor, IBM. Each 16K memory module consisted of two stacks, each stack containing sixteen planes of 4608 rods.

== Disk drives ==
The Model 655 disk drive used a removable disk pack. It was the first by NCR to employ floating or flying heads with 12 read/write heads per surface. This reduced track-to-track movement and thus access times. However, this meant that there were 12 times more heads per drive, increasing the likelihood of head crashes. These flying heads were moved using a 16 position magnetic actuator. The actuator used four different magnets to create the 16 positions. The magnetic actuators were later replaced with hydraulic actuators, and later yet the hydraulic actuators were replaced with voice coil actuators. In 1972 NCR sold its disk drive business to Magnetics Peripherals, Inc., a joint venture with CDC and thereafter used disk drives from the joint venture.

== Programming languages ==
The NCR Century 100 supported several programming languages: NEAT/3 (National's Easy Auto-coding Technique, a later version of the NEAT/1 language that ran on the NCR 315 computer system), COBOL, FORTRAN, RPG-II, NEAT/AM, and BASIC.

== Hardware ==
The system had 39 hardware instructions. Early versions of the hardware did not have hardware multiply or divide instructions; they were instead emulated using software. The machine used ASCII 8-bit code. It also supported packed decimal fields with or without a "sign". Without a sign, a (positive) number could be stored in just two bytes, with each of the eight bits of the character holding two digits, such as 0001 0010 0011 0100 for 1234.

A typical hardware configuration consisted of a panel with toggle switches and lights to enter the boot loader, a Teletype writer to input operating system commands, a punched card reader that gravity feed the cards (they dropped into the read station, and were ejected and turned 180 degrees and then placed in the exit hopper), two 655 disk drives, and a printer that printed about 600 lines per minute. The boot loader and peripherals were usually on punched cards, which notified the operating system which devices to use via a PAL (Peripheral Availability List) entry cards. The "go" command to the operating system was infamous: "EE" control-G (bell).

The Century 100 lacked hardware sense switches, which the Century 200 had. Programs that attempted to access sense switches on the Century 100 would simply halt with the humorous message: "You find the switches, and I'll test them!" displayed on the console typewriter.

A unique feature of the Century's hardware/software design allowed the normal 4K executive to be reduced to a mere 512 bytes, freeing up precious storage.

The Century 50 was slower than the Century 100 and only had 16K of thin-film memory.
