= NCR 315 =

1962 second-generation computer

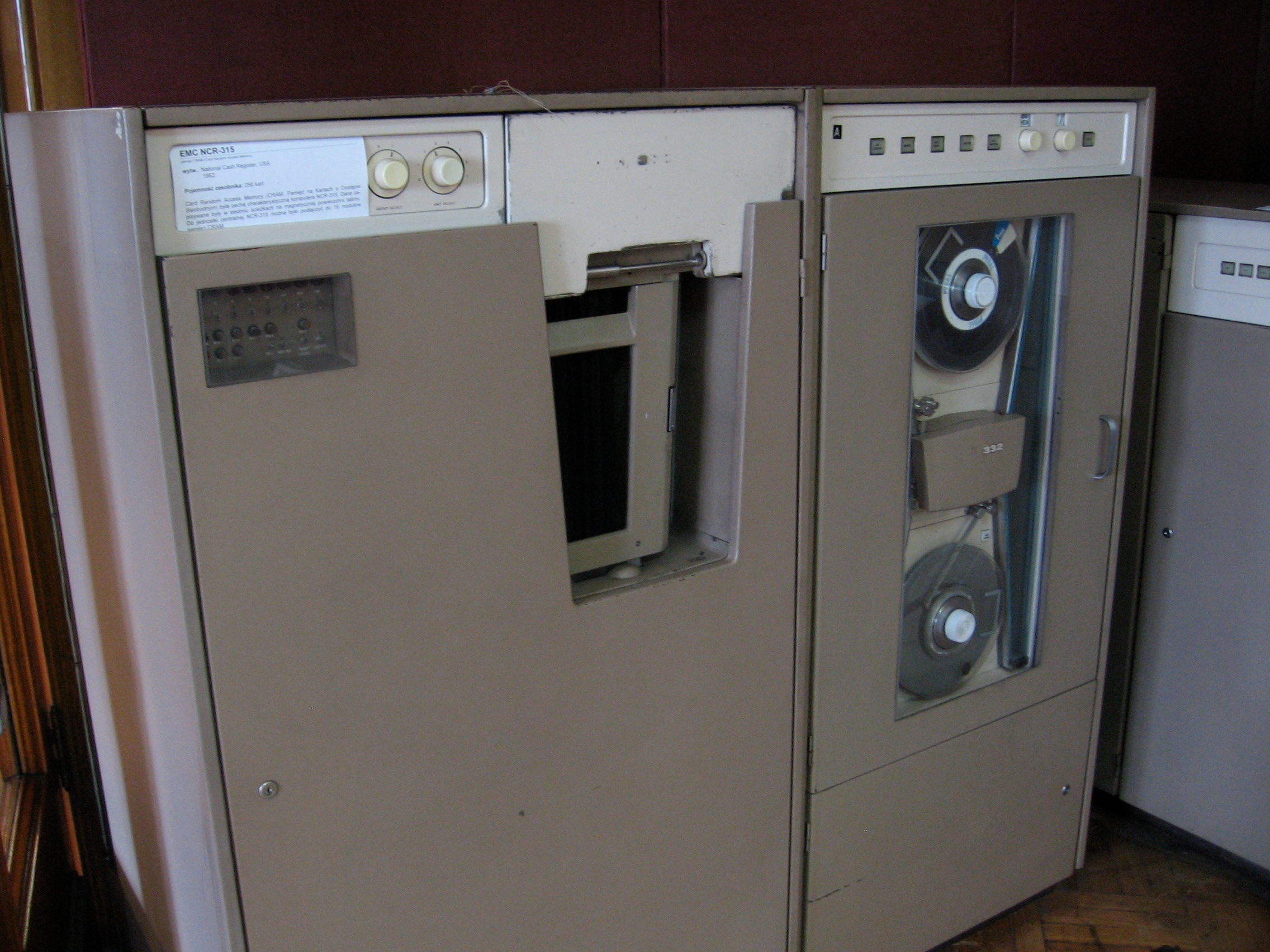
NCR 315

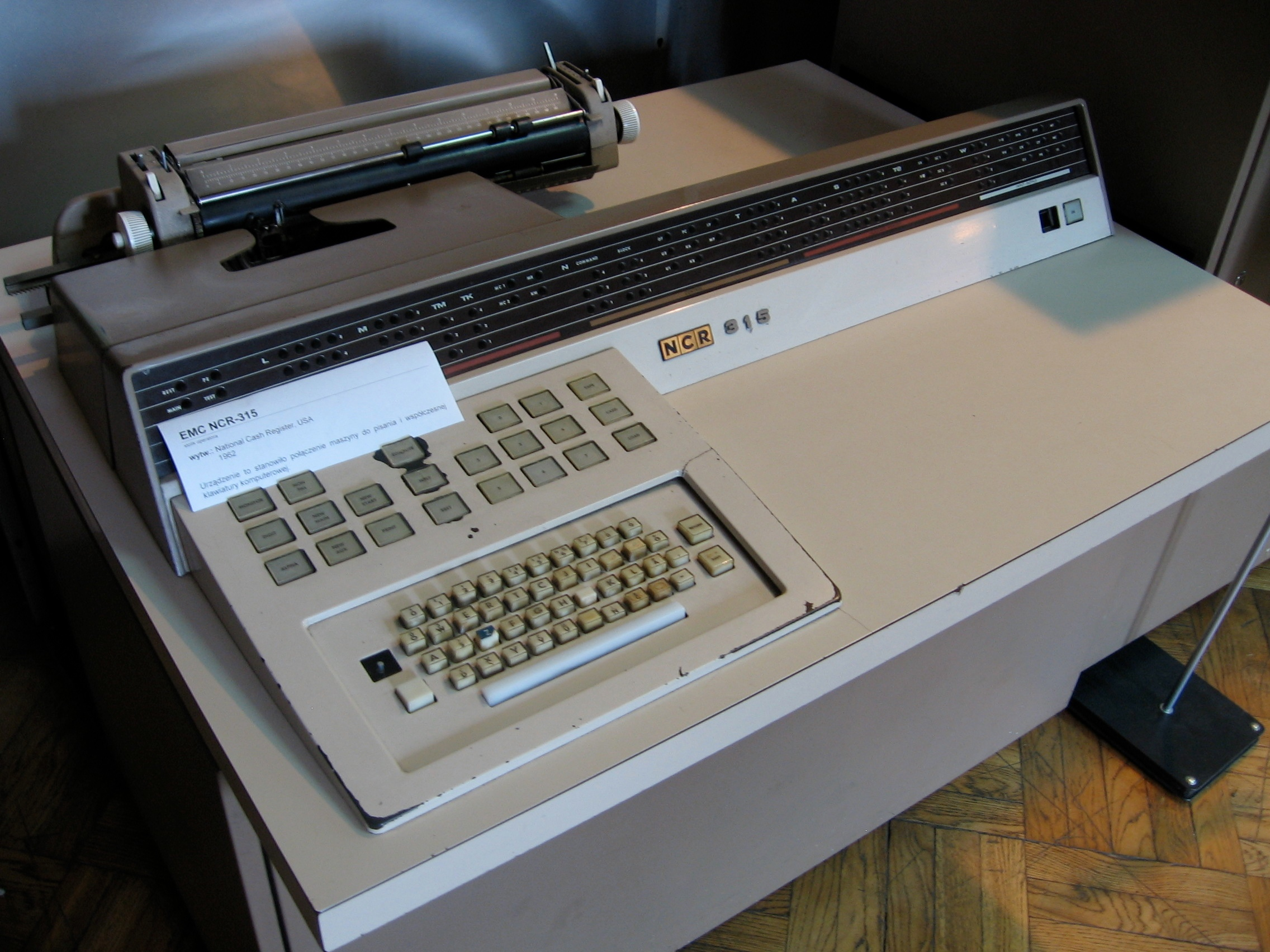
Console

The NCR 315 Data Processing System, released in January 1962 by NCR, is a second-generation computer. All printed circuit boards use resistor–transistor logic (RTL) to create the various logic elements. The magnetic-core memory is divided into 12-bit addressable units called slabs. The instructions can use a memory slab as either two 6-bit alphanumeric characters or as three 4-bit BCD digits. Basic memory is 5000 slabs (10,000 characters or 15,000 decimal digits), which is expandable to a maximum of 40,000 slabs (80,000 characters or 120,000 decimal digits) in four refrigerator-size cabinets. The main processor includes three cabinets and a console section that houses the power supply, keyboard, output writer (an IBM electric typewriter), and a panel with lights that indicate the current status of the program counter, registers, arithmetic accumulator, and system errors. Input/Output is by direct parallel connections to each type of peripheral through a two-cable bundle with 1-inch-thick cables. Some devices like magnetic tape and the CRAM are daisy-chained to allow multiple drives to be connected.

The central processor (315 Data Processor) weighed about 1,325 pounds (601 kg).

Later models in this series include the 315-100 and the 315-RMC (Rod Memory Computer).

== Memory organization ==
The addressable unit of memory on the NCR 315 series is a "slab", short for "syllable", consisting of 12 data bits and a parity bit. Its size falls between a byte and a typical word (hence the name, 'syllable'). A slab may contain three digits (with at sign, comma, space, ampersand, point, and minus treated as digits) or two alphabetic characters of six bits each. A slab may contain a decimal value from -99 to +999.

A numeric value contains up to eight slabs. If the value is negative then the minus sign is the leftmost digit of this row. There are instructions to transform digits to or from alphanumeric characters. These commands use the accumulator, which has a maximum length of eight slabs. To accelerate the processing the accumulator works with an effective length.

== NCR 315-100 ==
The NCR 315-100 is the second version of the original 315. It too has a 6-microsecond clock cycle, and from 10,000 to 40,000 slabs of memory. The 315-100 series console I/O incorporates a Teletype printer and keyboard in place of the original 315's IBM typewriter.

The primary difference between the older NCR 315 and the 315-100 was the inclusion of the Automatic Recovery Option (ARO). One of the problems with early generation of computers was that when a memory or program error occurred, the system would simply turn on a red light and halt. The normal recovery process was to copy all register and counter setting from the console light panel, and to restart the program that was running at the time of the error, usually from the very beginning of the program.

The upgrade to the 315 required the removal of approximate 1800 wire-wrapped connection on the backplane, and the installation of approximately 2400 new point-to-point wired connection.

== NCR 315-RMC ==
The NCR 315-RMC, released in July 1965, was the first commercially available computer to employ thin-film memory. This reduced the clock cycle time to 800 nanoseconds. It also included floating-point logic to allow scientific calculations, while retaining the same instruction set as previous NCR 315 and NCR 315-100.

The thin film is wrapped around "rods" to allow faster reading and writing of memory.

The follow-on to the 315-RMC was the NCR Century series.

== Available languages ==
- NCR Assembler Language
- National Electronic Autocoding Technique (NEAT) — similar to Autocoder
- COBOL
- BEST, a high-level preproocesor for NEAT

== Available peripherals ==
- NCR-321 Communications Controller
- NCR-340 600-LPM line printer
- Magnetic tapes
  - NCR-332 Magnetic tape drive (512 bpi)
  - NCR-333 Control Data CDC tape drive (512 bpi)
  - NCR-334 Magnetic Tape Drive (200/512 bpi)
- NCR-353 Magnetic Card Random Access Memory (CRAM)
- Card and paper tape equipment
  - NCR-361 Paper Tape Reader
  - NCR-371 Paper Tape Punch
  - NCR-376 IBM Card Reader/Punch
  - NCR-380 2000 CPS High speed card reader
  - NCR-472 Card Reader, Paper Tape Reader/Punch
- NCR-??? Drum memory
- NCR-402 MICR Check Reader/Sorter
- NCR-420 Optical Character Reader (OCR)
- NCR-407 High Speed MICR Check Reader/Sorter

== See also ==
- The Super Fight – Used an NCR 315 to predict its outcome
- Catena (computing)
