= Syllable (computing) =

Platform-specific data size used for some historical digital hardware

In computing, a syllable is a unit of information that describes the size of data for some digital hardware from the 1960s and 1970s. The size of the unit varies by hardware design in much the same way that word does. The term is not used for modern hardware; standardized terms, such as byte, are used instead.

Examples:

- 3-bit: some experimental CISC designs
- 6-bit: Burroughs B8500
- 8-bit: English Electric KDF9 (represented as syllabic octals and also called slob-octals or slobs in this context) and Burroughs B6500, B6700/B7700, and successors (see also: Burroughs B6x00-7x00 instruction set)
- 12-bit: NCR computers such as the NCR 315 (also called slabs in this context) and Burroughs B5000, B5500, and B5700 (see also: B5000 instruction set)
- 13-bit: Saturn Launch Vehicle Digital Computer (LVDC) and Gemini Spacecraft On-Board Computer (OBC)

== See also ==
- Catena (computing) – Base memory unit handled by a computer
- Nibble – Four-bit unit of binary data
- Opcode, aka instruction syllable – Part of a machine instruction
- Parcel (computing) – Unit of measure for digital data
- Syllable – Unit of organization for a sequence of speech sounds (in linguistics)
