= NCR-340 =

The NCR-340 was NCR's first line "High Speed" 300-line-per-minute computer printer. It used a 3-inch-diameter (76 mm) drum made up of 120 (later 132) hardened steel discs with the upper-case alphabet, the numbers 0-9 and a few special symbols. The discs were keyed on an armature, but could be changed if a character were damaged.

The drum sat above an 18-inch-wide (460 mm) ink ribbon. Below the ribbon the green-bar continuous form paper was moved into and out of the printer head on four tractor assemblies. Below the paper path were a set of 120 or 132 “hammers” that were triggered by electric solenoids.

Each line of a report was sent from the 315 to the printer and loaded into a buffer. As the print drum spun, a glass timing disc on one end would indicate to the internal logic that a character was in position to be printed. All of the “A” characters in the buffer would trigger the appropriate hammer to fire. The hammer would force the paper up against the ribbon, and hit the “A” character on the spinning drum for its position in the line. This would continue for one revolution of the drum printing.

The printer could print up to eight copies of a report by using carbon paper between each layer of paper. There was a whole industry and series of auxiliary machine ( collators) that would separate the different copies of the report and remove the carbons. Then the continuous reports were sent through a burster to separate individual pages.
