= Split octal =

Syllabic octal and split octal are two similar notations for 8-bit and 16-bit octal numbers, respectively, used in some historical contexts.

== Syllabic octal ==
Syllabic octal is an 8-bit octal number representation that was used by English Electric in conjunction with their KDF9 machine in the mid-1960s.

Although the word 'byte' had been coined by the designers of the IBM 7030 Stretch for a group of eight bits, it was not yet well known, and English Electric used the word 'syllable' for what is now called a byte.

Machine code programming used an unusual form of octal, known locally as 'bastardized octal'. It represented 8 bits with three octal digits but the first digit represented only the two most-significant bits (with values 0..3), whilst the others the remaining two groups of three bits (with values 0..7) each. A more polite colloquial name was 'silly octal', derived from the official name which was syllabic octal (also known as 'slob-octal' or 'slob' notation,).

This 8-bit notation was similar to the later 16-bit split octal notation.

== Split octal ==
Split octal is an unusual address notation used by Heathkit's PAM8 and portions of HDOS for the Heathkit H8 in the late 1970s (and sometimes up to the present). It was also used by Digital Equipment Corporation (DEC).

Following this convention, 16-bit addresses were split into two 8-bit numbers printed separately in octal, that is base 8 on 8-bit boundaries: the first memory location was "000.000" and the memory location after "000.377" was "001.000" (rather than "000.400").

In order to distinguish numbers in split-octal notation from ordinary 16-bit octal numbers, the two digit groups were often separated by a slash (/), dot (.), colon (:), comma (,), hyphen (-), or hash mark (#).

Most minicomputers and microcomputers used either straight octal (where 377 is followed by 400) or hexadecimal. With the introduction of the optional HA8-6 Z80 processor replacement for the 8080 board, the front-panel keyboard got a new set of labels and hexadecimal notation was used instead of octal.

Through tricky number alignment the HP-16C and other Hewlett-Packard RPN calculators supporting base conversion can implicitly support numbers in split octal as well.

== See also ==
- IBM SQUOZE
- od – Unix octal dump utility
- DEC RADIX 50
- Squawk code
- x86 memory segmentation (segment:offset addressing)
