= FSD =

FSD may refer to:

== Places ==
- Faisalabad, Pakistan
- Sioux Falls Regional Airport, South Dakota, United States (IATA code: FSD)

== Education ==
- Ferndale School District, Washington
- Florida School for the Deaf, St. Augustine, Florida
- Framwellgate School Durham, England
- Frankenmuth School District, Michigan
- Fremont School District (disambiguation)
- French School of Detroit, Michigan
- Filer School District, Idaho; see Filer High School
- Fellowship in Sports dentistry; see Indian Dental Association

== Organizations ==
- Florida State Department, the state department for Florida, United States
- Foundation for Sustainable Development
- Freedom Service Dogs, an American animal rescue
- Hong Kong Fire Services Department
- Swiss Foundation for Mine Action (Fondation Suisse de déminage)

== Science and technology ==
=== Computing ===
- Full Self-Driving, an advanced driver-assistance system from Tesla, Inc.
- File system driver
- Free Software Directory
- The Free Software Definition
- Functional specifications document

=== Other uses in science and technology ===
- Female sexual dysfunction
- Fourteen-segment display
- Flame supervision device
- Full-stack developer
- Free Shipping Day
- Full scale deflection, the maximum amount the pointer of an analog meter can be deflected

== Other uses ==
- Dirección Federal de Seguridad or the Federal Security Directorate
- Fox Sports Detroit, an American regional sports network
- Free Software Daily, a former website about free software
- Forensic Science Division or Forensic Science Department
- Department of Commercial Vehicles, a Polish auto manufacturer, in business 1952–2003
