= Elektor Junior Computer =

1980s kit computer from Elektor magazine

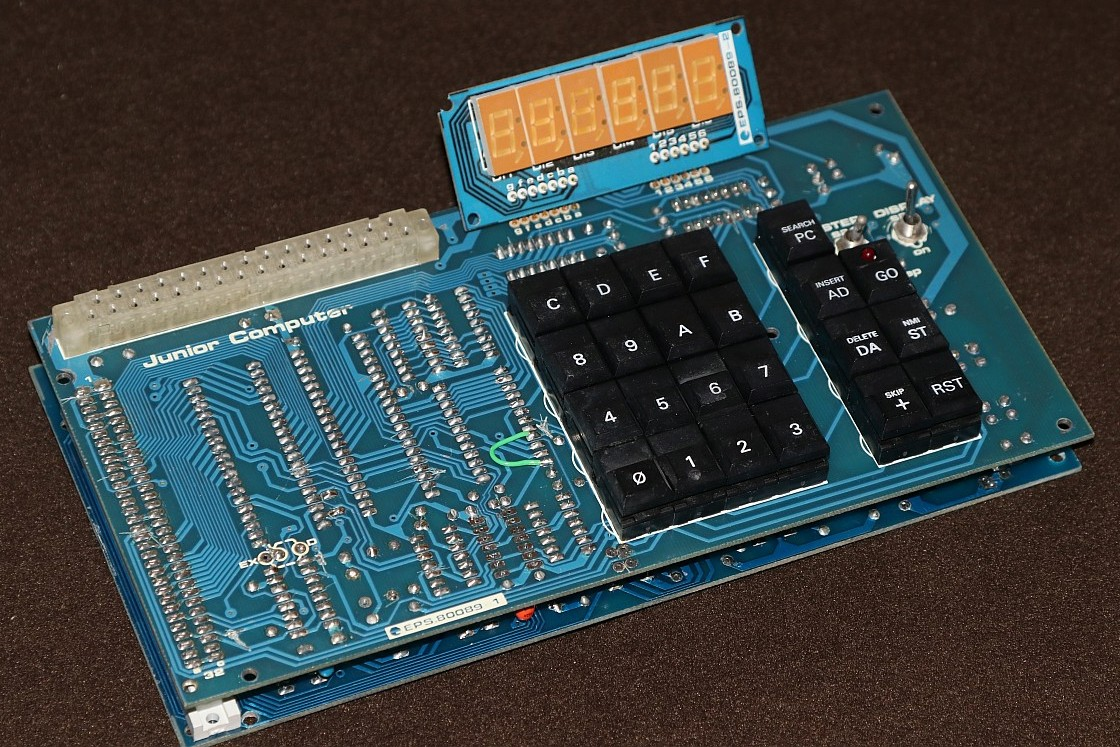
- Developer: Loys Nachtmann
- Type: microprocessor development board
- Released: 1980s
- CPU: 6502

The Elektor Junior Computer was a 6502-based microprocessor development board published in the 1980s in the Dutch, German and later French, Spanish, British and Indian versions of Elektor/Elektuur, in the form of a series of articles and four books. It was developed by the German engineer Loys Nachtmann.

The Junior Computer was a virtual clone of the KIM-1, only it did not use the special I/O+ROM chips (MCS6530) but rather an off-the-shelf 6532 RIOT and a 2708 1K EPROM. It also had a different physical shape, as it used the Eurocard board, and a 31-pin DIN connector for I/O and a DIN 41612 connector for system expansion. It was delivered as an electronic kit or could purchased as two printed circuit boards (main board and seven-segment display board) only, for components to be installed.

As it was much lower in price than an original KIM, many more Junior computers (several thousands) were used in the Netherlands, Germany and France, than original KIM-1s.

Later extension boards were developed, and a BASIC interpreter was ported. Elektor expansion boards specifically for the Junior were an I/O interface card (including a 6522 VIA, a tape recorder interface and a RS-232 port), a VDU (video terminal) (an improvement of the previous "elekterminal" design), an EPROM and SRAM expansion board, a 16/64 KB DRAM board and EPROM programmer board, and a floppy disk controller, as well as a dozen smaller boards for small improvements and interfaces.
