= AIM-65 =

1978 US microcomputer

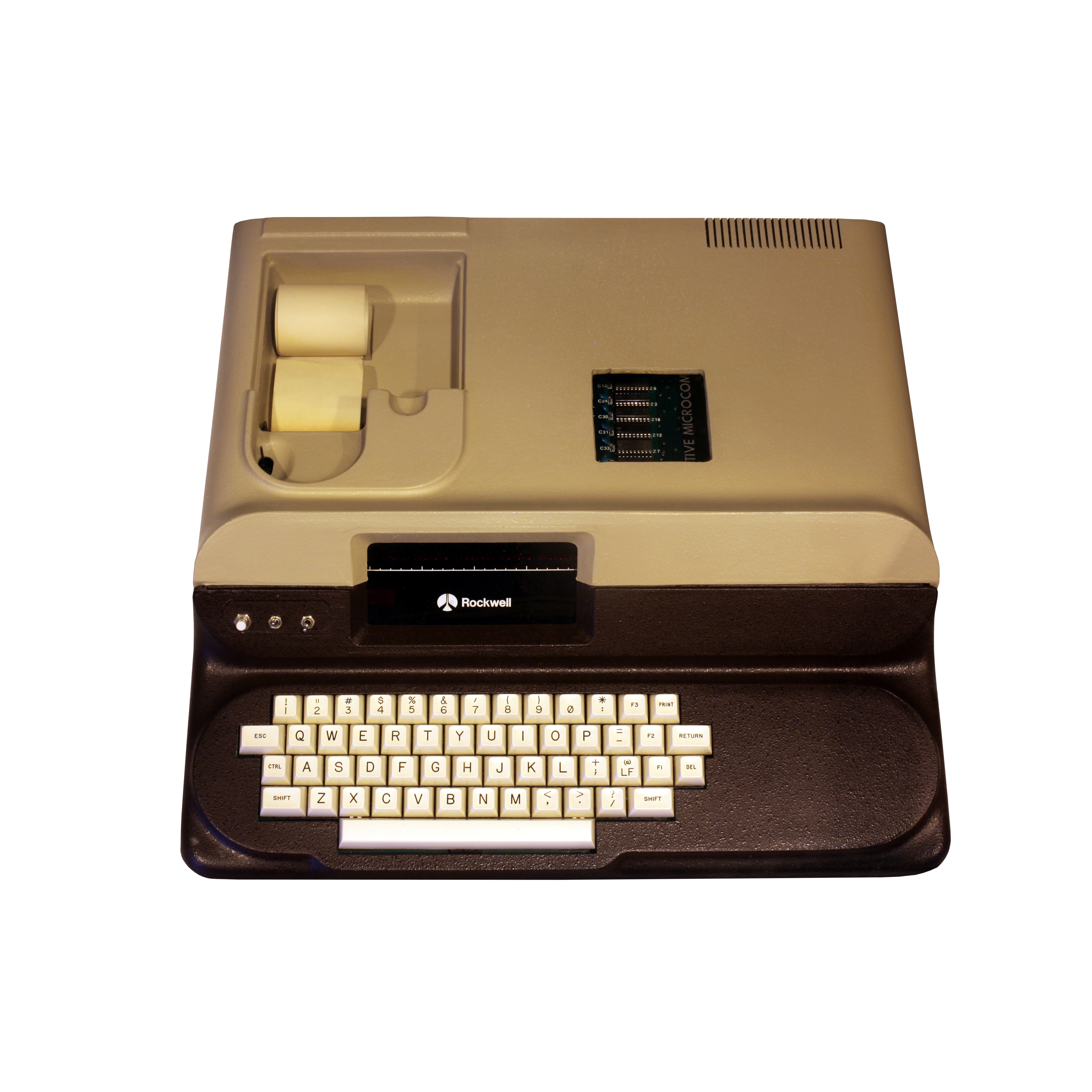
- Rockwell AIM-65 computer. On display at the Musée Bolo, EPFL, Lausanne.
- Developer: Rockwell
- Manufacturer: Rockwell
- Type: development computer
- Released: 1978; 48 years ago
- Introductory price: US$375 (equivalent to $1,900 in 2025)
- CPU: MOS Technology 6502
- Memory: 1 KB RAM

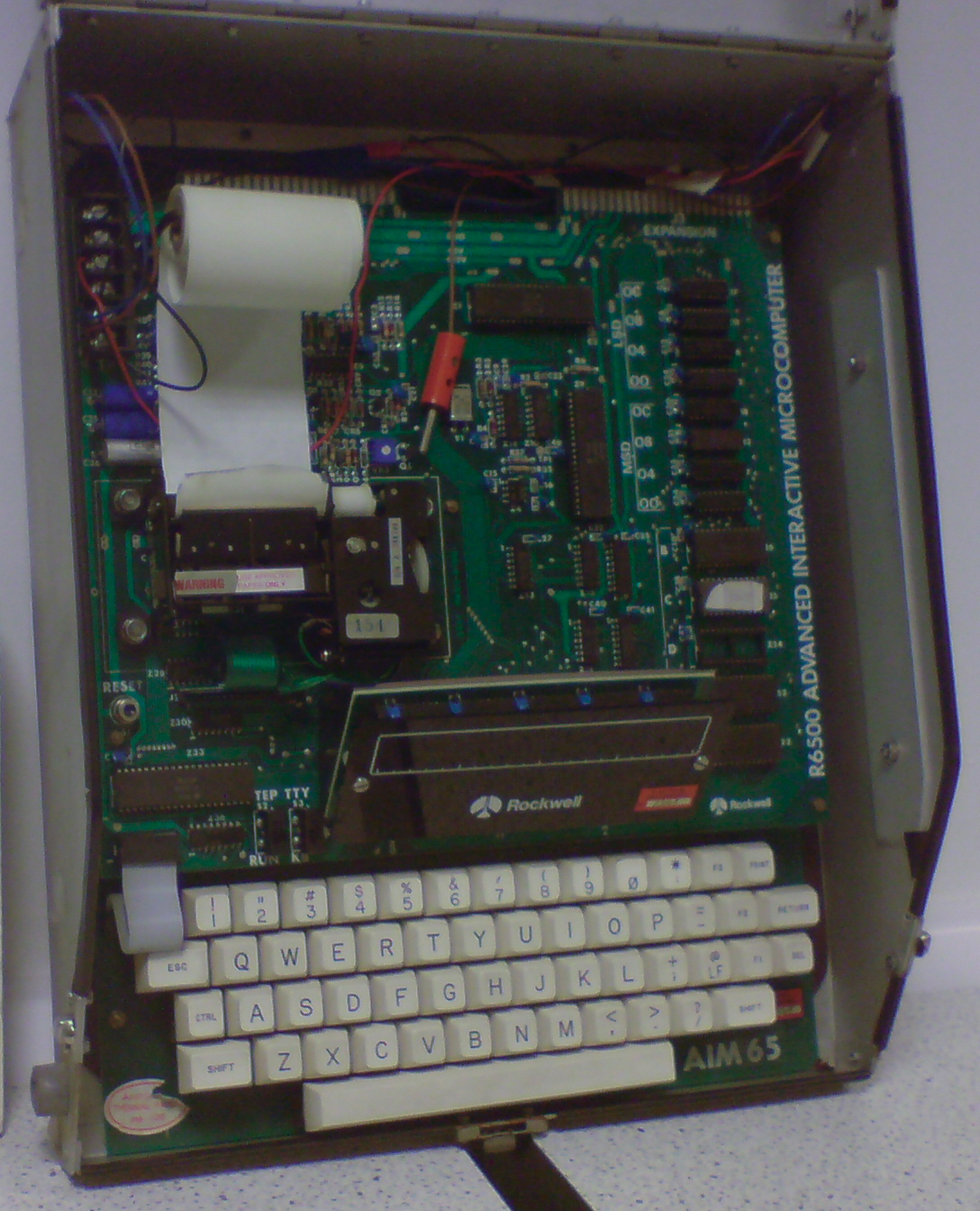
AIM-65

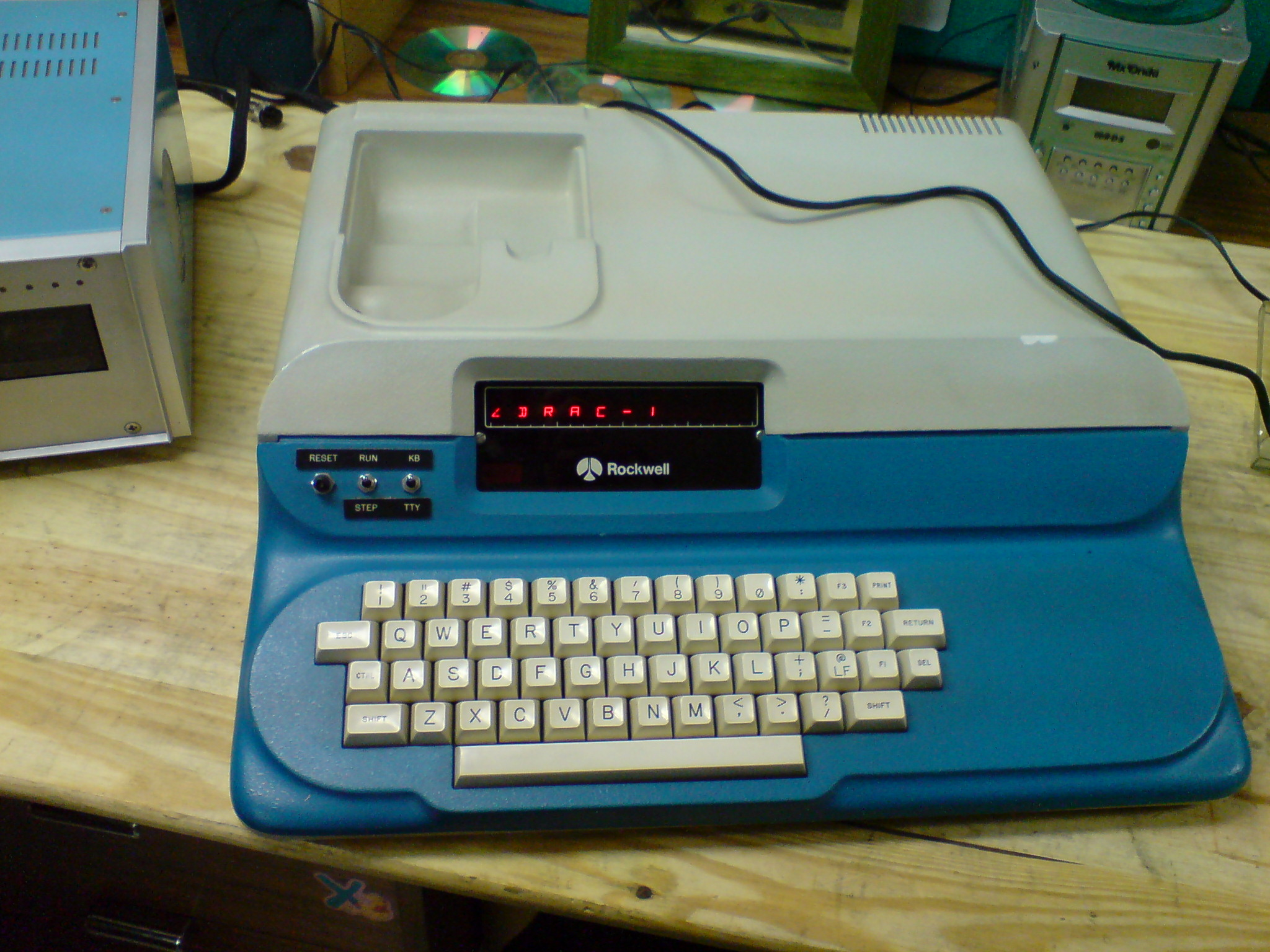
Comelta Drac-1

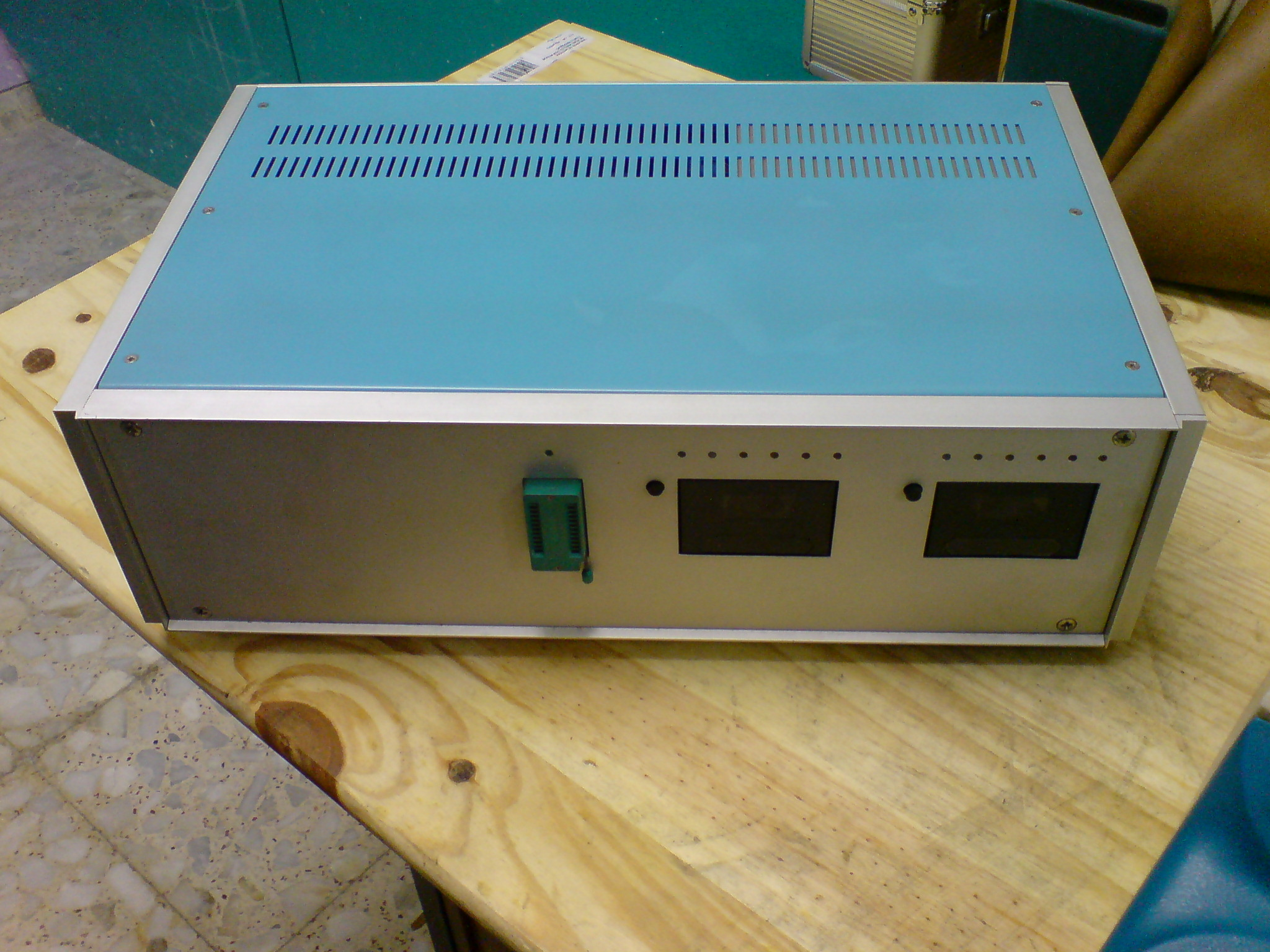
Comelta Drac-1 and expansion box

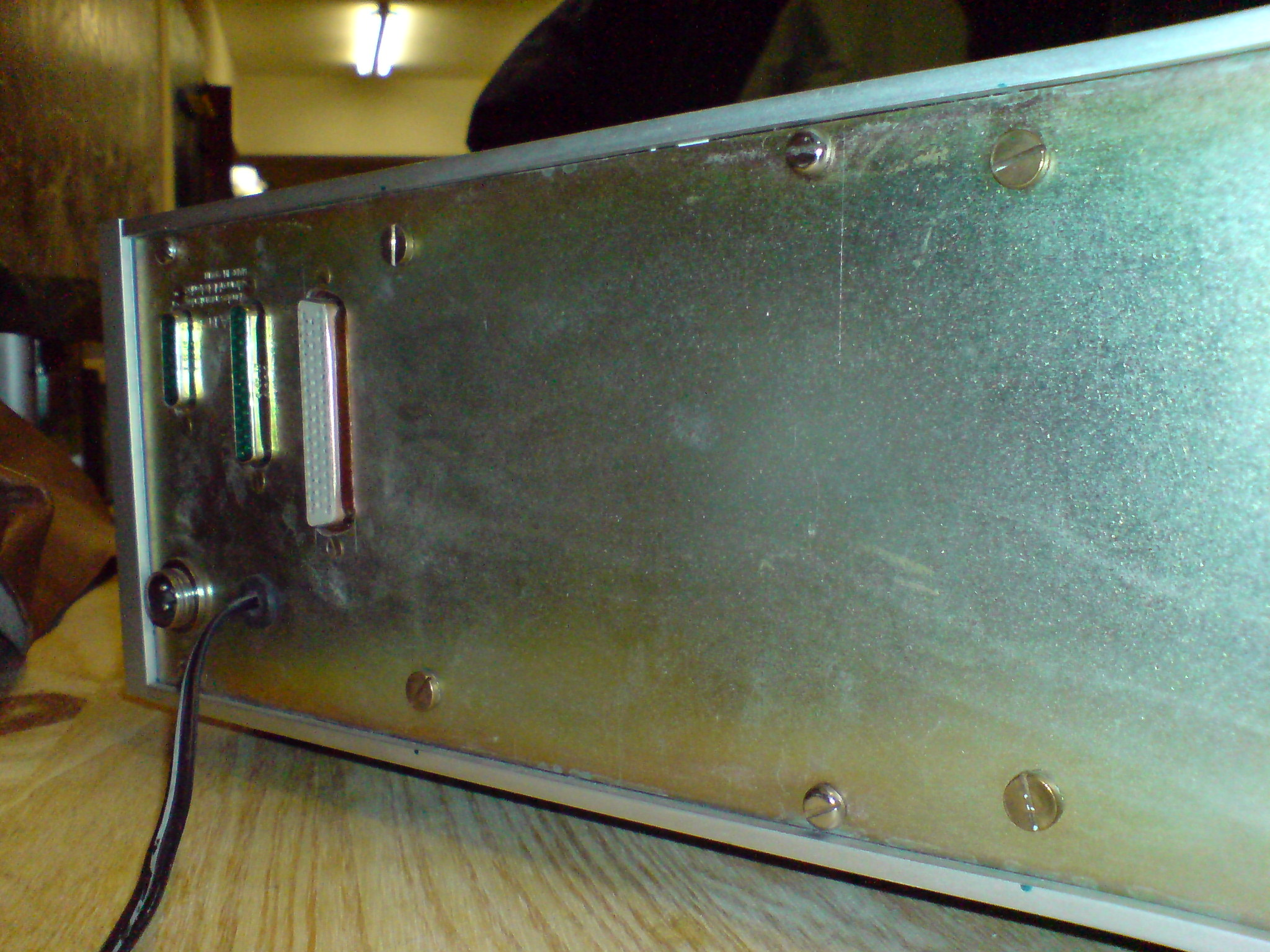
Back of expansion box

The Rockwell AIM-65 computer is a development computer introduced in 1978 based on the MOS Technology 6502 microprocessor. The AIM-65 is essentially an expanded KIM-1 computer. Available software included a line-oriented machine code monitor, BASIC interpreter, assembler, Pascal, PL/65, and Forth development system. Available hardware included a floppy disk controller and a backplane for expansion.

== Features ==
Rockwell advertised the $375 AIM-65, with 1K RAM, as an "easy, inexpensive [computer] ... for learning, designing, work or just fun". Standard software included the system console monitor software in ROM, called Advanced Interactive Monitor. It featured an assembler, disassembler, setting and viewing memory and registers, starting execution of other programs and more. Single stepping was made possible using non-maskable interrupt (NMI). The command prompt was the less-than sign "<", and on receiving a single character command, it added this input character and the greater-than sign ">". If the thermal printer was turned on, this would be output on a single line. The monitor included a number of service routines that could be accessed and used by a user's program to control I/O and code execution and was fully documented, including source code.

The machine featured dual cassette tape controls. This made it possible to write large assembly programs using the two-pass assembler ROM. Source code in text was written twice consecutively to the input tape, and then the assembler, which could start/stop the input cassette tape using motor control, was invoked. During the first pass, the symbol table was built and stored in RAM. During the second pass, symbols would be translated and code written out on the second tape, also using start/stop motor control. Being able to avoid storing code in RAM made it possible to save a lot of space. It was, however, still important to keep the symbols list short since RAM size was often no more than 4 KB.

In 1981, Rockwell introduced an improved model with a 40-character display as the AIM-65/40. An industrial chassis version was known as the System 65 and included a PROM burner and floppy drives. Rockwell was also a pioneer in solid-state storage devices, introducing "bubble memory" non-volatile expansion boards in 1980.

Micro Technology Unlimited (MTU) made a "Visible Memory" card in 1978 that worked with the KIM-1 and AIM-65 computers, providing raster graphics display capability. MTU also made the first real-time music synthesizer for a microcomputer; it worked with the KIM-1 and AIM-65 and featured a DAC with software providing 4 voices of wavetable-lookup synthesis.

In Spain, they were distributed by Comelta. This company made various card expansions:

- CR-106 8 Kbytes of RAM
- CR-119 RAM / ROM / PROM expansion
- CR-120 Universal programming
- CR-115 Microcassette controller(two units)
- CR-113 Video controller
- CR-401 Board Bus Extension(Standard S-64)

Comelta assembled all the options in a single box to produce a new computer, the Comelta Drac-1. The first prototype used microcassettes, but definitive versions have two 8" floppy disk drives.

In the late 1970s, the Rockwell AIM-65 and its successor, System 65, became the first computers used to board a float in the Tournament of Roses Parade. Cal Poly universities wrote their own animation control language to control hydraulic and motor actuators on floats for many years. In 2003, some of these 27-year-old computers were still in use, controlling various displays and creatures at a high-tech Halloween show near Alexandria, Virginia, U.S.

== Technical specifications ==
- Built-in full-sized QWERTY keyboard
- 20 character alphanumeric LED display (16 segments)
- Integrated 20 character thermal printer
- 20 mA current-loop serial interface (can be adapted to RS-232)
- Expansion connector
- Application connector with 6522 VIA chips
- 4 KB RAM
- 5 sockets for 4 KB ROM/EPROM chips

== Reception ==
Compute! stated that the monitor was by itself almost worth the price of the AIM-65. It concluded that the computer was "an excellent value at the $375 needed for minimum configurations".

== Programming ==
PL/65 was a programming language designed and implemented by Rockwell International for the AIM-65. It is based on a mix of ALGOL and PL/I, simplified where possible in order to adapt to the limited processing environment afforded by the 6502 (64k memory for instance).

Some models had Forth as the built-in language.

== Software ==
Commercial game software advertised for the AIM-65 by July 1980 included Microchess from MICRO Software and Systems Design's Games Library cassette, containing Craps, Checkers, Student, Blackjack and Tic Tac Toe.

== Emulation ==
AIM-65 can be emulated using the MESS Emulator. But that emulation lacks printer support. Also, the Sysinfo.dat file states that "we would suffer from support for intelligent terminals as test equipment."

== See also ==
- Microprocessor development board
- Elektor Junior Computer
- SYM-1
