= Peak Military Care Network =

- Metro area: Colorado Springs, Colorado
- Country: United States
- Founded: 2004
- Org. type: NPO
- Website: http://pmcn.org/

Peak Military Care Network (PMCN) is a nonprofit based in Colorado Springs, Colorado. Founded in 2004, PMCN’s mission is to connect military service members, veterans and their families to community resources in the Colorado.

== History ==
PMCN was created in 2004 as the National Homeland Defense Foundation. Founded was proved by the El Pomar Foundation. In 2015, the National Homeland Defense Foundation relaunched as the Peak Military Care Network. Their goal is to connect military members and veterans with services in their community. The Pikes Peak is the only region to house a major Army installation (Fort Carson), three Air Force installations (Peterson Air Force Base, Schriever Air Force Base and Cheyenne Mountain Air Force Station), and a leading service academy (U.S. Air Force Academy). One in four residents in the Pikes Peak area is a military member or veteran.

== Services ==
PMCN provides a number of services and has a wide network of partners.

The services provided are:

- Advocacy
- Behavior Health
- Caregiver Support
- Child & Family Services
- Crisis Intervention
- Workforce Readiness
- Educational Services
- Financial & Benefits Assistance
- Housing Assistance
- Health Services
- Social Services
- Substance Abuse Treatment
- Transition and Reintegration Assistance
- Utility Service Assistance

== Partners ==
PMCN has partnered with more than 40 organizations to provide an expansive network of care.

Their partner agencies include:

- Amblicab
- American Red Cross
- Angels of America’s Fallen
- AspenPointe Health Services
- CASA
- Cedar Springs Hospital
- CPCD
- Goodwill
- El Paso County Department of Human Services
- Veterans Service Office
- Employer Support of the Guard and Reserve
- Family Care Center
- SET Family Medical Clinics
- Freedom Service Dogs
- Give An Hour
- Mt. Carmel Center of Excellence of Colorado
- University of Colorado Colorado Springs
- Onward to Opportunity
- Operation Homefront
- Operation TBI Freedom
- Peak View Behavior Health
- Peak Vista Community Health Centers
- Pikes Peak Area Council of Governments
- The Phoenix
- Pikes Peak State College
- Pikes Peak Restorative Justice Council
- Pikes Peak Suicide Prevention
- Pikes Peak Therapeutic Riding Center
- United Way
- Pikes Peak Workforce Center
- Project Sanctuary
- Rocky Mountain Human Services
- Silver Key Senior
- TESSA
- Home Front Cares
- The Independence Center
- The Resource Exchange
- The Strum Center at the University of Denver
- USO
- Pikes Peak Community College
- Veterans Squaring Away Veterans
- YMCA
