= Freedom Service Dogs =

US non-profit organization

- Tax ID no.: 84-1068936
- Location: Englewood, Colorado
- Revenue: $2,744,962 (2015)
- Expenses: $1,602,323 (2015)
- Endowment: $3,798,327
- Website: www.freedomservicedogs.org

Freedom Service Dogs is a Denver, Colorado–based charitable organization devoted to training dogs as service dogs for people with disabilities that include multiple sclerosis, muscular dystrophy, Down syndrome, cerebral palsy, spinal-cord injury, PTSD, and more. The organization began a small-scale breeding program in 2019 to increase the number of people it could help.

== Background ==
FSD is a 501(c)(3) nonprofit organization founded in 1987 by Michael and P.J. Roche. Freedom Service Dogs is an accredited and voting member of Assistance Dogs International, which sets and promotes standards and ethics for assistance dog training organizations all over the world.

FSD has partnered with the United States Veterans Administration to train dogs to provide assistance dogs for veterans, part of a program by the VA to make the provision of an assistance dog an integrated part of treatment plans. In addition, FSD has partnered with the Peak Military Care Network to help provide service dogs to veterans.

== Training ==
Puppies are paired with a volunteer puppy raiser for approximately ten months, before returning for service dog training, which generally lasts 4–8 months. Each dog is assigned a trainer and undergoes a comprehensive health assessment and a behavioral/training assessment based on Assistance Dogs International's breeding corporative standards.

Service dogs are trained to increase independence for people with disabilities. Each dog is matched to a specific client and custom trained according to his or her individual needs. Dogs can be trained to assist a client in their mobility, as well as retrieving items, fetching help, operating simple equipment (push a light switch or alert button). The dog also provides company, and can comfort their owner during nightmares or flashbacks.

== Programs ==
- Operation Freedom – developed in 2009 to address problems experienced by soldiers returning from combat situations, such as PTSD, immobility, and inactivity, and provides dogs for veterans from Vietnam through the current conflict in Iraq and Afghanistan—and also for some active duty service personnel. FSD trains around 40 dogs a year through this program, at a cost of around $25,000 per dog. Costs are met largely through donations, and no charge is made to the recipient of the dog.
- Pawsitive Connection – works with at-risk young people aged from 11 to 18—particularly those in foster care, young people with ADHD and other learning issues, and young people in the juvenile justice system. The young people assist in training the dogs, supervised by teachers and a dog trainer. This occurs during the early phases of training when dogs are learning basic commands, and the students handle service dogs-in-training once a week for 8 to 12 weeks.
- Professional Therapy Dogs – is a partnership between Freedom Service Dogs and the University of Denver Institute for Human/Animal Connection and Graduate School of Social Work. The program uses animal-assisted therapy to benefit people with mental and physical disabilities. FSD also provides dogs for work with other therapists.
