= Fremont School District =

Fremont School District can refer to:

- Fremont Unified School District - California
- Fremont Union High School District - California
- Fremont School District RE-2 - Colorado
- Fremont Community School District - Iowa
- Fremont County Joint School District 215 - Wyoming
