= Free Shipping Day =

Annual commercial event

Free Shipping Day is a one-day event held annually in mid-December. On the promotional holiday, consumers can shop from both large and small online merchants that offer free shipping with guaranteed delivery by Christmas Eve.

== History ==
Free Shipping Day was started in 2008 by Luke and Maisie Knowles, founders of Coupon Sherpa and FreeShipping.org, in an effort to extend the online shopping season. Statistics at the time showed online shopping peaked on Cyber Monday, generally held the week immediately following Black Friday. Consumers believed they would not receive their online orders in time for Christmas after that date.

The first event was created in two weeks by Knowles. Several hundred merchants participated and media attention was unusually high. In 2009, more than 750 retailers participated, with 350,000 plus sales taking place through the official site FreeShippingDay.com. Merchant participation has more than doubled each subsequent year. Knowles talked with Time magazine writer Brad Tuttle in 2010 about the role of free shipping as a promotional tool, saying, "I see a trend of free shipping offers around the holidays having a lower threshold than they have in years past ... we are seeing more merchants offering free shipping on ALL orders".

Free Shipping Day was featured on NBC's Today show, Fox Business, CNN and CBS's Early Show, as well as in The New York Times, Real Simple, Better Homes and Gardens, O, The Oprah Magazine and more than 70 other media outlets.

In 2010, the third Free Shipping Day began at 12 a.m. EST on Friday, December 17, and ended at 12 a.m. EST, December 18. More than 1,700 merchants from all 50 states participated and the official site saw 317,000 unique visitors. Online shoppers spent $942 million to make Free Shipping Day the third highest spending day of the 2010 holiday season, ultimately boosting online sales 61 percent from 2009. In 2011, Free Shipping Day became a billion-dollar shopping holiday with $1.072 billion in sales, followed by $1.01 billion during Free Shipping Day 2012.

In 2013, Knowles changed the format of Free Shipping Day to only include merchants that could waive all minimum order requirements and guarantee delivery by Christmas Eve. Sales during the event on December 18, 2013, were $868 million, jumping to $926 million the following year.

== Global ==
The event creators have also branched out into Canada and the United Kingdom.
