= MOS Technology RRIOT =

Integrated circuit made by MOS Technology

The 6530 ROM-RAM-I/O-Timer (RRIOT) was an integrated circuit made by MOS Technology, as well as second sources such as Rockwell. It was very similar to the MOS 6532 RIOT, but it incorporated 1 KB of ROM, in addition to the chip's other features. The static RAM, however, was reduced from 128 bytes to 64. Due to the very high degree of integration provided by this chip, it could be used with a microcontroller to comprise a full working computer.

Since the incorporated ROM was mask programmed, there were several versions of the chip which were marked as 6530-001, 6530-002 and so on. Not all the 6530 versions are marked as 6530, especially the later ones that were used in Commodore disk drives.

== Uses ==
The 6530 chip is contained in the following products:

- 6530-001 Probably first version MOS TIM-1.
- 6530-002 One of two RRIOTs used in the MOS KIM-1 computer.
- 6530-003 Second of two RRIOTs used in the MOS KIM-1 computer.
- 6530-004 Used in the MOS TIM-1 computer kit. Paired with a 6502 that you had to acquire yourself along with memory and other I/O chips. Very rare.
- 6530-005 Unprogrammed 6530. According to OSI note this was used with an empty ROM (which would make it more or less into a 6532).
- 6530-006 Allied Leisure pinball version 1 (IC6)
- 6530-007 Allied Leisure pinball version 1 (IC3)
- 6530-008 Allied Leisure pinball version 1 (IC5)
- 6530-009 Allied Leisure pinball version 2 (IC5)
- 6530-010 Allied Leisure pinball version 2 (IC6)
- 6530-011 Allied Leisure pinball version 2 (IC3)
- 6530-013 Used in the CBM 2040/3040/4040 disk drive DOS 1.0
- 6530-014 Used in Gottlieb system 1 sound board
- 6530-016 Used in Gottlieb system 80/80A/80B sound boards
- 6530-024 Commodore CHESSmate (based upon Peter Jennings MicroChess)
- 6530-028 Marked as 901483-01 and used in the CBM 2040/3040/4040 disk drive DOS 1.2
- 6530-034 Marked as 901466-04 and used in the CBM 2040/3040/4040 disk drive DOS 2.2
- 6530-036 Marked as 901483-02 and used in the CBM 8050 disk drive DOS 2.5
- 6530-038 Marked as 901483-03 and used in the CBM 8050 disk drive DOS 2.5
- 6530-039 Marked as 901483-04 and used in the CBM 8050 disk drive DOS 2.5
- 6530-040 Marked as 901884-01 and used in the CBM 8050/8250 disk drive DOS 2.7
- 6530-044 Marked as 901885-01 and used in the CBM 8050/8250 disk drive DOS 2.7
- 6530-047 Marked as 901885-04 and used in the CBM 8050/8250 disk drive DOS 2.7
- 6530-048 Marked as 901469-01 and used in the CBM 8050/8250 disk drive DOS 2.7
- 6530-050 Marked as 251256-02 and used in the CBM 8250LP disk drive DOS 2.7
- 6530-241 MIOT in pinball machines
- 6530-243 MIOT in pinball machines

The form factor was a 40-pin ceramic or plastic DIP package. Early chips were offered in white ceramic, while later were in purple ceramic or plastic. All chips seems to have been manufactured by MOS technology or Rockwell. A version of 6530-004 by Synertek exists.
