= List of early microcomputers =

This is a list of early microcomputers sold to hobbyists and developers. These microcomputers were often sold as "DIY" kits or pre-built machines in relatively small numbers in the mid-1970s. These systems were primarily used for teaching the use of microprocessors and supporting peripheral devices, and unlike home computers were rarely used with pre-written application software. Most early micros came without alphanumeric keyboards or displays, which had to be provided by the user. RAM was quite small in the unexpanded systems (a few hundred bytes to a few kilobytes). By 1976 the number of pre-assembled machines was growing, and the 1977 introduction of the "trinity" of Commodore PET, TRS-80 and Apple II generally marks the end of the "early" microcomputer era, and the advent of the consumer home computer era that followed.

== Discrete logic ==
Before the advent of microprocessors, it was only possible to build small computers using small-scale integrated circuits (ICs), where each IC contained only a few logic gates or flip-flops.

- The Kenbak-1 (1971) used small-scale integration transistor–transistor logic (TTL) ICs and had 256 bytes of memory. It was priced at USD 750 and sold only 40 units.
- Datapoint 2200 (shipped 1971) was the first machine designed to use a microprocessor, but when Intel could not deliver the 8008 in time, the machine was released using discrete logic.
- The EDUC-8 (1975) was an Electronics Australia magazine project describing a computer built from TTL ICs.

== Test, single-board and development machines ==
As microprocessors were developed, companies often released simple development systems to bootstrap the use of the processor. These systems were often converted by hobbyists into complete computer systems.

Intel's Intellec computers were a series of early microcomputers Intel produced starting in the 1970s as a development platform for their processors.

This is a sortable list; click on the icon at the top of each column to sort by the contents of that column.
Model	Processor	Year	Format	Remarks	Ref
Intel SIM4-01, SIM4-02	Intel 4004	1971	bare board	Intel's developer kit for the 4004. Sold as the "MCS-4 Micro Computer Set".	
Intel SIM8-01	Intel 8008	1972	bare board	Intel's developer kit for the 8008. Sold as the "MCS-8 Micro Computer Set".	
Mycron MYCRO-1	Intel 8080	1974	complete board	Single-board computer with CPU, a little RAM, ROM and serial port. Expandable to a full system with a standard double-slot Eurocard backplane and chassis.	
MOS Technology KIM-1	MOS Technology 6502	1975	complete board	MOS's developer kit for the 6502, widely used in a number of projects	
Motorola MEK6800D2	Motorola 6800	1976	complete board		
MPT8080 Microtutor	Intel 8080	1976	complete board	A trainer type single-board-computer. As recently as 2008, it remained in academic use.	As of 2011, the MPT8080 was still available for sale.
Rockwell AIM-65	6502	1978	complete board		
Synertek SYM-1	6502	1978	complete board		
RCA COSMAC VIP	RCA 1802	1978	complete board	2K RAM, 512 byte ROM, cassette and video interfaces	
Intel SDK-85	Intel 8085	1978	kit		
Tesla PMI-80	Intel 8080 clone	1982	complete board	A Czechoslovak single-board microcomputer.	

== Kits ==
Many early microcomputers were available in electronic kit form. Machines were sold in small numbers, with final assembly by the user. Kits took advantage of this by offering the system at a low price point. Kits were popular, beginning in 1975, with the introduction of the famous Altair 8800, but as sales volumes increased, kits became less common. The introduction of useful fully assembled machines in 1977 led to the rapid disappearance of kit systems for most users. The ZX81 was one of the last systems commonly available in both kit and assembled form.

Some magazines published plans and printed circuit board layouts from which a reader could in principle duplicate the project, although usually commercially made boards could be ordered to expedite assembly. Other kits varied from etched, drilled, printed circuit boards and a parts list to packages containing cases, power supplies, and all interconnections. All kits required significant assembly by the user.

This is a sortable list; click on the icon at the top of each column to sort by the contents of that column.
Model	Processor	Year	Format	Remarks	Ref
Comstar Star System 4	Intel 4004	1972	PCB and several chips/cards; optionally expandable	Intended for embedded/industrial applications which did not merit a minicomputer. A complete basic system included one PROM board and chip, one RAM board and chip, a CPU module, digital I/O board, power supply, and mounting rack, altogether for $995. Was in use by November 1972 in a paper tape editing system.	
SCELBI	Intel 8008	1974		Was the earliest commercial kit computer based on the Intel 8008 microprocessor. Sold for embedded control applications.	
Mark-8	Intel 8008	1974	Plans published; an etched board was available but constructors had to source all parts		
MITS Altair 8800	Intel 8080	1975	PCB, parts, and case	Introduced S-100 bus	
IMSAI 8080	Intel 8080	1975	PCB, parts, and case		
Comp-Sultants Micro 440	Intel 4040	1975		First 4040-based micro	
SWTPC 6800	Motorola 6800	1975	PCB, parts, and case	Introduced SS-50 bus	
The Digital Group	Zilog Z80	1976	Kits or assembled PCBs. Including cases from 1978	The first company to produce mostly complete systems built around the Zilog Z80 processor. Their products also included options for MOS 6502 and Motorola 6800 processors.	
COSMAC Elf	RCA 1802	1976			
Apple I	MOS Technology 6502	1976	Assembled PCB; buyer supplied rest of components		
Processor Technology Sol-20	Intel 8080	1976	Offered both as kit and assembled, but the vast majority were sold assembled.		
Nascom, Nascom 1	Zilog Z80	1977			
Nascom 2	Z80	1979			
Telmac 1800	RCA 1802	1977			
Newbear 77-68	Motorola 6800	1977			
Heathkit H8	Intel 8080	1977	All parts, case and power supply, detailed instructions	Heathkit was a notable manufacturer of electronics kits	
Heathkit H11	LSI-11	1977	All parts, case and power supply, detailed instructions	A 16-bit microcomputer compatible with a PDP-11	
Electronics Australia 77up2 aka "Baby 2650"	Signetics 2650	1977			
Netronics ELF II	RCA 1802	1977			
Quest SuperELF	RCA 1802	1978			
Elektor TV Games Computer	Signetics 2650	1979			
System 68	Motorola 6800	1977	Electronics Today International magazine project		
PSI Comp 80	Z80	1979		By Powertran from a design in the magazine Wireless World	
RGS-008	Intel 8008	1974		By RGS Electronics; the first computer system ever reviewed in Byte	
Science of Cambridge MK14	National Semiconductor SC/MP	1978		Low-cost kit expandable to video output	
Acorn System 1	6502	1979			
Tangerine Microtan 65	6502	1979		Rack-based extendible system	
Compukit UK101	6502	1979	Practical Electronics magazine project (clone of Ohio Scientific Superboard II)	BASIC in ROM	
Sinclair ZX80	Z80	1980	PCB, parts, and case	Among the last popular kit systems	
Sinclair ZX81	Z80	1981	PCB, parts, and case	Among the last popular kit systems	
MicroBee	Zilog Z80	1982		The computer was conceived as a kit, with assembly instructions included in Your Computer magazine, in February 1982.	

== Complete microcomputers ==
A number of complete microcomputers were offered even before kits became popular, dating to as far back as 1972. For some time there was a major market for assembled versions of the Altair 8800, a market that grew significantly through the late 1970s and into the early 1980s. The introduction of three computers aimed at personal users in 1977, the Radio Shack TRS-80, Apple II, and Commodore PET, significantly changed the American microcomputer market and led to the home computer revolution.

This is a sortable list; click on the icon at the top of each column to sort by the contents of that column.
Model	Processor	Year	Remarks	Ref
Seiko S-500	Intel 8008	1972	Programmable desktop calculator marketed as a desktop computer, which could be used as such by connecting other peripherals such as teletypes. Advertised as early as May 1972, just a month after the release of the Intel 8008.	
Q1 Corp. Q1	Intel 8008	1972	The first general purpose microcomputer to ship with a built in alphanumeric user interface. First delivered on December 11th, 1972 and advertised in early 1973.	
Omni Electronics Omni 2700	Intel 4004 or 8008	1972	Typewriter-sized general-purpose data processing machine introduced sometime before 1973. Also used Intel's PROM and RAM chips.	
MicroSystems International CPS-1	MIL MF7114	1973	Using a locally produced microprocessor based on the design of the Intel 4004. First built in 1972, a small number shipped in early 1973.	
Micral N	Intel 8008	1973	Awarded the title of "the first personal computer using a microprocessor" by a panel at the Computer History Museum in 1986.	
Seiko 7000	Intel 8080	1974	Another desktop calculator usable as a computer when connected to a teletype. Introduced in February 1974, presumably using pre-release engineering samples of the Intel 8080, which were first produced just two months earlier.	
Q1 Corp. Q1/Lite	Intel 8080	1974	The first self-contained general-purpose desktop computer to ship with the Intel 8080 microprocessor in April 1974 (as a pre-production unit) and one of the first commercially available computers with the 8080 in June 1974 (first production units shipped August 1974). Also included a built-in printer and early multi-line flat-panel plasma display.	
Sord Computer Corporation SMP80/20	Intel 8080	1974	Debuted in May 1974 with an Intel 8080 and 8k of RAM. Preceded by the Intel 8008-based SMP80/08, which was announced in early 1973 but never commercially released.	
Intelligent Systems Corp. Intecolor 8000	Intel 8008, later Intel 8080 (buyer's choice)	1974	First offered in May 1974. Marketed as an intelligent terminal, and initially contained an Intel 8008 (later 8080 optionally) and up to 24k RAM. Fit entirely on a desktop and was capable of raster color text and graphics.	
Micral S	Intel 8080	1974	Introduced by R2E as the successor to the Micral N and G by August 1974. Used the then-new Intel 8080.	
MCM/70	Intel 8008	1974	Primarily designed to run APL. According to the IEEE Annals of Computer History, the MCM/70 is the earliest commercial, non-kit personal computer.	
IBM 5100	IBM PALM	1975	An early portable computer with integrated monitor; the 5100 was possibly one of the first portable microcomputers using a CRT display.	
Sphere 1	Motorola 6800	1975	A personal computer that was among the earliest complete all-in-one microcomputers that could be plugged in, turned on, and be fully functional.	
Tandberg Radiofrabrikk/Tandberg Data TDV-2114	Intel 8080	1976	One of the first all-in-one microcomputers developed in Europe. It was sold as a complete package, with CPU-module, Memory-modules and a 8" floppy-disk drive w/module all built into a case with a TDV-2115 dumb-terminal. It was initially marketed towards businesses as an "intelligent terminal" and workstation, running Tandberg-OS (having the look and feel of Intel ISIS). After the separation of Tandberg Data, this machine would also be available in OEM form as the Siemens System 6.610.	
Radio Shack TRS-80	Zilog Z80	1977	Mainly targeting North America, it was very popular as a home computer.	
Apple II	6502	1977	Quickly became the leading business desktop workstation with software such as VisiCalc, but also somewhat popular as a home computer. Initially only available in the US, but would eventually be available worldwide.	
Commodore PET	6502	1977	Most popular as an educational computer used in schools, but some success as a business or academic workstation too. Later, the PET would eventually see limited popularity in Europe.	
ECD Micromind	MOS Technology 6512	1977		
Ohio Scientific Model 500	6502	1978		
Exidy Sorcerer	Z80	1978		
Explorer/85	8085	1979		
ComPAN 8	8080/8085	1980	Designed in the Institute of Industry Automation Systems PAN in Gliwice and produced in the MERA-ELZAB factory in Zabrze.	

== See also ==
- List of home computers
- List of home computers by video hardware
- Microprocessor development board
- Microcomputer Associates, Incorporated
