= Byte (magazine) =

Defunct American microcomputer magazine

- Vol. 1, no. 4, December 1975
- Categories: Computer magazines
- Frequency: Monthly
- Publisher: UBM Technology Group
- First issue: September 1975; 51 years ago
- Final issue: July 1998; 28 years ago
- Company: Green Publishing Inc.; Byte Publishing Inc.; McGraw-Hill; CMP Media; UBM
- Country: United States
- Based in: Peterborough, New Hampshire
- Language: English
- Website: byte.com at the Wayback Machine (archived 1996-12-20)
- ISSN: 0360-5280

Byte (stylized as BYTE) was a microcomputer magazine, influential in the late 1970s and throughout the 1980s because of its wide-ranging editorial coverage.

Byte started in 1975, shortly after the first personal computers appeared as kits advertised in the back of electronics magazines. Byte was published monthly, with an initial yearly subscription price of $10. Whereas many magazines were dedicated to specific systems or the home or business user's perspective, Byte covered developments in the entire field of "small computers and software", and sometimes other computing fields such as supercomputers and high-reliability computing. Coverage was in-depth with much technical detail, rather than user-oriented.

The company was purchased by McGraw-Hill in 1979, a watershed event that led to the rapid purchase of many of the early computer magazines by larger publishers. By this time the magazine had taken on a more serious journal-like atmosphere and began to refer to itself as "the small systems journal". It became an influential publication; Byte was selected as the medium used by Xerox PARC to publicize Smalltalk in 1981.

Like many generalist magazines, Byte suffered in the 1990s due to declining advertising sales. McGraw-Hill's publishing arm was sold to CMP Media in May 1998, and the new owners immediately laid off almost everyone in the magazine arm, ending publication with the already-complete July edition. The associated website continued to draw 600,000-page views a month, prompting the owners to re-open the magazine in a pure online format in 1999. It continued as an online publication until 2009, when it shut down, only to be revived in 2011 and then shut down permanently in 2013.

== Foundation ==
Wayne Green was the editor and publisher of amateur radio magazine 73. In late 1974 and throughout 1975, 73 published a number of articles on the use of computers, which resulted in a significant response from the readers. The Altair 8800 was announced in January 1975, sparking off intense interest among those working technical fields, including the amateur radio market. Green knew of the Altair because MITS had previously been an advertiser in 73. This led Green to begin plans for a magazine dedicated to the newly emerging microcomputer market.

In 1974, Carl Helmers published a series of six articles that detailed the design and construction of his "Experimenter's Computer System", a personal computer based on the Intel 8008 microprocessor. In January 1975 this became the monthly ECS magazine with 400 subscribers. Green contacted Helmers and proposed starting a new magazine to be known as Byte. The deal was announced in both magazines in May.

Green's editorial column in the August 1975 issue of 73 started with this item:

The response to computer-type articles in 73 has been so enthusiastic that we here in Peterborough got carried away. On May 25th we made a deal with the publisher of a small (400 circulation) computer hobby magazine to take over as editor of a new publication which would start in August ... Byte.

The last issue of ECS was published on 12 May 1975. In June, subscribers were mailed a notice announcing Byte magazine. Helmers wrote to another hobbyist newsletter, Micro-8 Computer User Group Newsletter, and described his new job as editor of Byte magazine:

I got a note in the mail about two weeks ago from Wayne Green, publisher of '73 Magazine' essentially saying hello and why don't you come up and talk a bit. The net result of a follow up is the decision to create BYTE magazine using the facilities of Green Publishing Inc. I will end up with the editorial focus for the magazine; with the business end being managed by Green Publishing.

To advertise the new magazine, Green contacted a number of the companies that had been advertising in 73 and asked for their contact lists. He then sent letters out to these people telling them about the new magazine. This resulted in about 20% of the contacts subscribing, a massive conversion rate.

== Early editions, formation of Kilobaud ==
Just prior to planning Byte, Green had a run-in with the Internal Revenue Service. When he told his lawyer that he planned on starting a new magazine, he was advised to put it in someone else's name. He had recently gotten back together with his ex-wife, Virginia Londner Green, who had been listed as the business manager of 73 Inc. since December 1974. She incorporated Green Publishing in March 1975 to take over publication.

The first issue of the new magazine was the September 1975 edition. Articles in the first issue included Which Microprocessor For You? by Hal Chamberlin, Write Your Own Assembler by Dan Fylstra and Serial Interface by Don Lancaster. It featured an in-depth review of the RGS-008, a basic 8008-based kit computer released by RGS Electronics. Among the more important articles was the introduction of the Kansas City standard for storing data on cassette tape, which was used by most machines of the era. It included advertisements from Godbout, MITS, Processor Technology, SCELBI, and Sphere, among others.

Until the December 1988 issue, a continuing feature was Ciarcia's Circuit Cellar, a column in which electronic engineer Steve Ciarcia described small projects to modify or attach to a computer. This was later spun off to become the magazine Circuit Cellar, focusing on embedded computer applications. Significant articles in this period included the insertion of floppy disk drives into S-100 computers, publication of source code for various computer languages (Tiny C, BASIC, assemblers), and coverage of the first microcomputer operating system, CP/M.

The first four issues were produced in the offices of 73 and Wayne Green was listed as the publisher. One day in November 1975 Green came back to the office and found that the Byte magazine staff had moved out and taken the January issue with them. For the February 1976 issue, the company changed its name to Byte Publications. Carl Helmers was a co-owner of Byte Publications. The February issue has a short story about the move; "After a start which reads like a romantic light opera with an episode or two reminiscent of the Keystone Cops, Byte magazine finally has moved into separate offices of its own."

Green was not happy about losing Byte and decided to start a new magazine called Kilobyte. He announced these intentions early, and advertised the upcoming magazine in 73, with the goal of shipping the first issue in December 1976 (the January 1977 edition). Byte quickly took out a trademark on "KILOBYTE" as the name for a cartoon series in Byte magazine, and threatened to sue for trademark violations. This forced Green to change the name of the new magazine to Kilobaud. There was competition and animosity between Byte Publications and 73 Inc. but both remained in the small town of Peterborough, New Hampshire.

== Growth and change ==
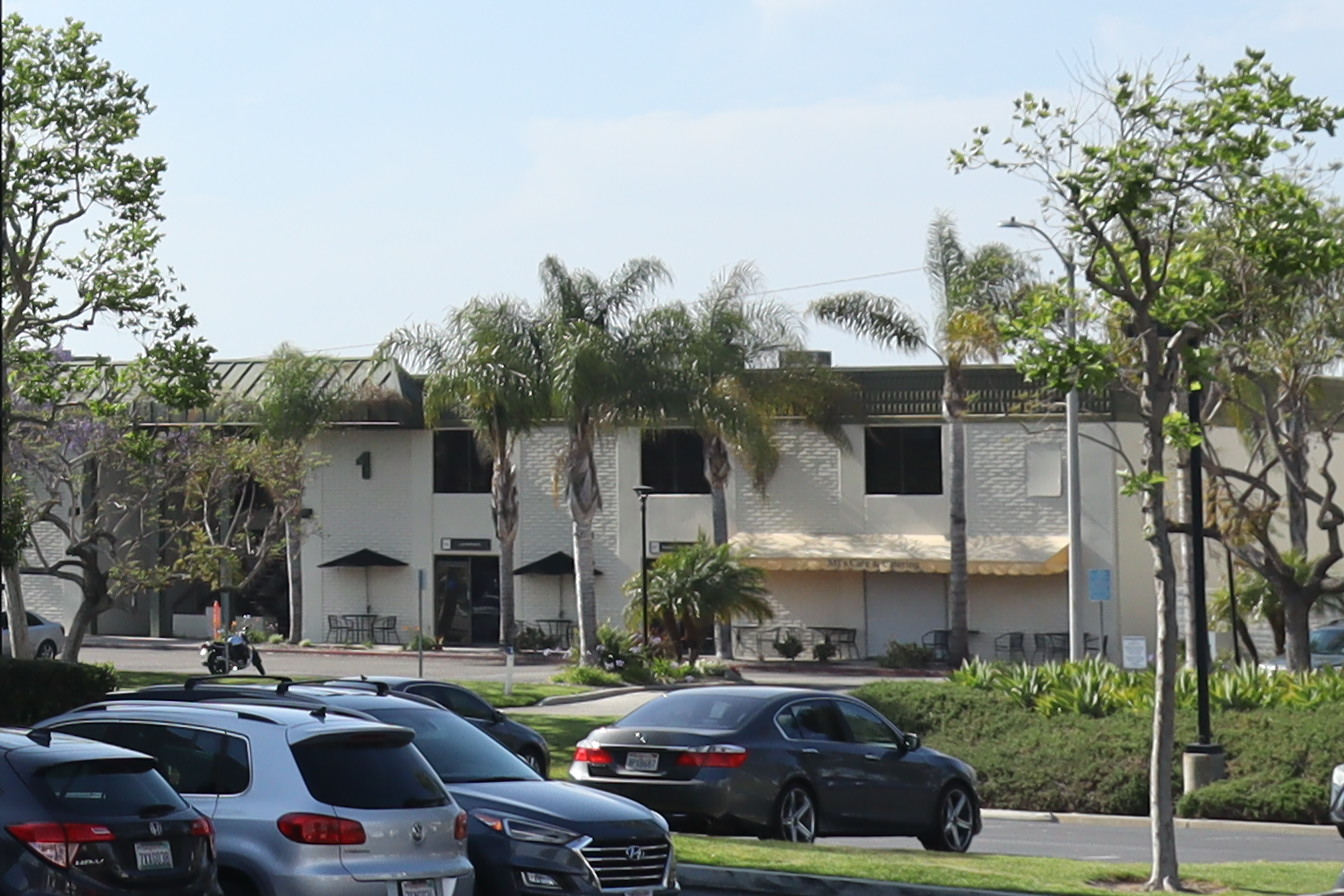
Byte leased an office for one of their West Coast Branch operations in this building in Costa Mesa, California (pictured in 2022).

In April 1979, owner/publisher Virginia Williamson (née Londner Green) sold Byte to McGraw-Hill. At the time, Byte's paid circulation was 156,000 readers, making it second only to Business Week in the McGraw-Hill's technology magazine portfolio. She remained publisher until 1983 and became a vice president of McGraw-Hill Publications Company. From August 1979, the magazine switched to computerized typesetting, using a Compugraphic system. Shortly after the IBM PC was introduced, in 1981, the magazine changed editorial policies. It gradually de-emphasized the do-it-yourself electronics and software articles, and began running product reviews. It continued its wide-ranging coverage of hardware and software, but now it reported "what it does" and "how it works", not "how to do it". The editorial focus remained on home and personal computers.

By the early 1980s, Byte had become an "elite" magazine, seen as a peer of Rolling Stone and Playboy, and others such as David Bunnell of PC Magazine aspired to emulate its reputation and success. It was the only computer publication on the 1981 Folio 400 list of largest magazines. Byte's 1982 average number of pages was 543, and the number of paid advertising pages grew by more than 1,000 while most magazines' amount of advertising did not change. Its circulation of 420,000 was the third-highest of all computer magazines. Byte earned $9 million from revenue of $36.6 million in 1983 ($118 million in 2025), twice the average profit margin for the magazine industry. It remained successful while many other magazines failed in 1984 during economic weakness in the computer industry. The October 1984 issue had about 300 pages of ads sold at an average of $6,000 per page ($18,594 in 2025).

Starting with the December 1975 issue through September 1990, Byte covers often featured the artwork of Robert Tinney. These covers made Byte visually distinctive. However, issues featuring cover stories introducing significant hardware such as the Apple Lisa, Apple Macintosh, IBM PC and Commodore Amiga featured product photographs on the covers.

From approximately 1980 to 1985, cartoonist Tom Sloan drew full page multipanel cartoons. They covered various computer/tech related themes. Several of the original cartoons are now in the Computer History Museum in Mountain View, California.

Around 1985, Byte started an online service called BIX (Byte Information eXchange) which was a text-only BBS-style site running on the CoSy conferencing software, also used by McGraw-Hill internally. Access was via local dial-in or, for additional hourly charges, the Tymnet X.25 network. Monthly rates were $13/month for the account and $1/hour for X.25 access. Unlike CompuServe, access at higher speeds was not surcharged. Later, gateways permitted email communication outside the system.

By 1990, the magazine was about one-half inch (1.3 cm) in thickness and had a subscription price of $56 per year ($138.00 in 2025). Around 1993, Byte began to develop a web presence. It acquired the domain name byte.com and began to host discussion boards and post selected editorial content.

Editions were published in Japan, Brazil, Germany, and an Arabic edition was published in Jordan.

== End of print publication, online shift, and demise ==
The readership of Byte and advertising revenue were declining when McGraw-Hill sold the magazine to CMP Media, a successful publisher of specialized computer magazines, in May 1998. The magazine's editors and writers expected its new owner to revitalize Byte, but CMP ceased publication with the July 1998 issue, laid off all the staff and shut down Byte's rather large product-testing lab.

Publication of Byte in Germany and Japan continued uninterrupted. The Turkish edition resumed publication after a few years of interruption. The Arabic edition also ended abruptly.

Many of Byte's columnists migrated their writing to personal web sites. One such site was science fiction author Jerry Pournelle's weblog The View From Chaos Manor derived from a long-standing column in Byte, describing computers from a power user's point of view. After the closure of Byte magazine, Pournelle's column continued to be published in the Turkish editions of PC World, which was soon renamed as PC Life in Turkey. Nikkei Byte, with the name licensed from McGraw Hill, was the leading computer magazine in Japan, published by Nikkei Business Publications. It continued Pournelle's column in translation as a major feature for years after Byte closed in the U.S.

In 1999, CMP revived Byte as a web-only publication, from 2002 accessible by subscription. It closed in 2009.

UBM TechWeb brought the Byte name back when it officially relaunched Byte as Byte.com on July 11, 2011. According to the site, the mission of the new Byte was:

...to examine technology in the context of the consumerization of IT. The subject relates closely to important IT issues like security and manageability. It's an issue that reaches both IT and users, and it's an issue where both groups need to listen carefully to the requirements of the other: IT may wish to hold off on allowing devices and software onto the network when they haven't been properly tested and can't be properly supported. But the use of these devices in the enterprise has the air of inevitability for a good reason. They make users more productive and users are demanding them.

The Byte.com launch editor-in-chief was tech journalist Gina Smith. On September 26, 2011, Smith was replaced by Larry Seltzer. In January 2012 American science fiction and horror author F. Paul Wilson began writing for byte.com, mostly in the persona of his best-known character Repairman Jack.

Byte.com closed in 2013.
