= RGS-008 =

Early microcomputer

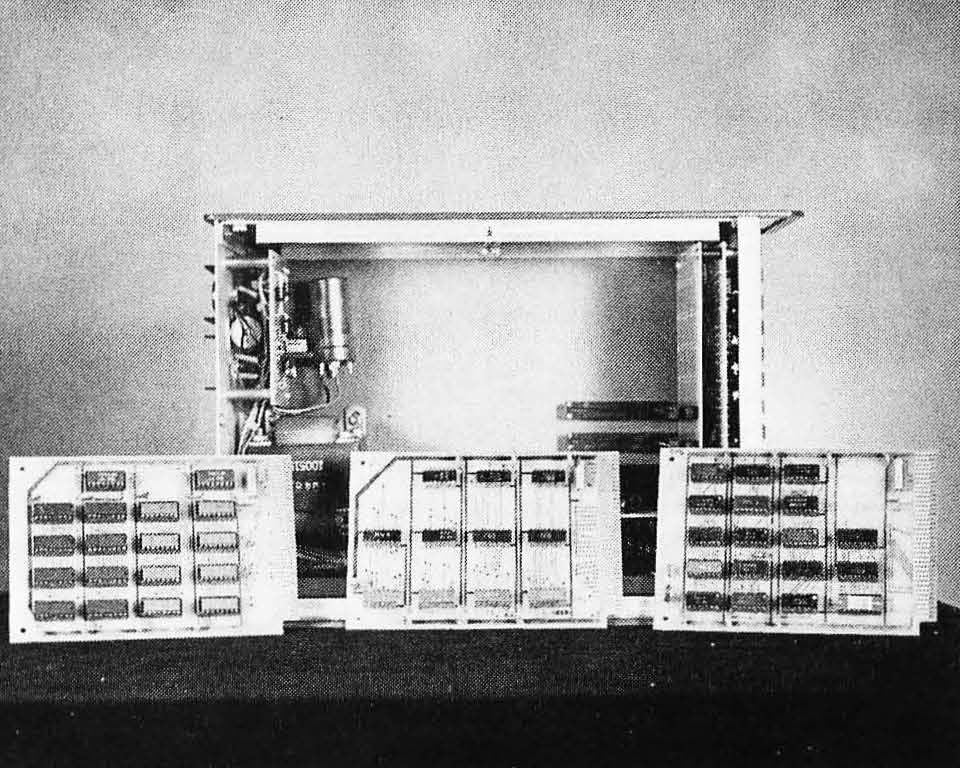
- A disassembled RGS-008, showing the backplane and constituent boards
- Developer: Ray G. Stevens
- Manufacturer: RGS Electronics
- Type: Microcomputer
- Released: 1974; 52 years ago
- CPU: Intel 8008
- Memory: 1–4 KB RAM

The RGS-008, also written as the RGS-008A, is an early microcomputer released as a kit by RGS Electronics of Santa Clara, California, in 1974. Based on the Intel 8008 microprocessor, the RGS-008 was among the first wave of microcomputers released to the public in the early-to-mid-1970s. It holds the distinction of being the first computer system reviewed in the charter issue of Byte, a highly influential computer magazine.

== Specifications ==
The RGS-008, as shipped, comprises six printed circuit boards and all the necessary components (including ICs, Molex connectors, switches, and LEDs) to build up the CPU board, the memory board, the backplane, the front panel, and the power supply. The CPU board sports an Intel 8008 microprocessor, while the stock RAM board features 1 KB worth of RAM (later increased to 4 KB of RAM stock). The backplane's bus is based on double-sided, 72-pin edge connectors; it can theoretically accommodate a total of 256 peripheral devices.

== Development and release ==
The RGS-008A was developed by Raymond G. "Ray" Stevens of RGS Electronics, a start-up electronics company in Santa Clara, California. It was introduced sometime in 1974, between the release of the SCELBI in March 1974 and the release of Mark-8 in July 1974, with an original price of US$375 (equivalent to $2,391 in 2024). On its release, it was one of the cheapest microcomputer kits available on the market. Part of the reason for its low cost was the fact it was sold in kit form only. Additionally, unlike some other popular computer kits at the time, the RGS-008 did not ship with a cabinet to hold all the components; customers were expected to supply their own.

The RGS-008's bus was derived from the design for an 4-KB memory board for the Mark-8 microcomputer by Godbout Electronics. According to Bill Godbout, the design of the RGS-008 was superior to that of the S-100 bus as introduced by the Altair 8800 in early 1975. Per Godbout, the RGS-008 was designed with proper termination and copious grounds, design elements which the original design of the S-100 bus lacked. Despite these advantages, the RGS-008 sold poorly and was completely overshadowed by the unveiling of the Altair 8800 in late December 1974, which started the microcomputer revolution in earnest. EDN's Carl Warren surmised that the lack of extravagant blinkenlights and an "unspectacular" look doomed the RGS-008 to obscurity. By May 1981, RGS Electronics was defunct.

Today, the RGS-008 is exceedingly rare to find, but it is not as well-remembered or desirable as other systems of the first wave of microcomputers, according to journalist and computer collector Michael Nadeau, such as the Altair or the SCELBI. An intact RGS-008 kit survives in the custody of the Computer History Museum in Mountain View, California.
