= The Digital Group =

- Industry: Electronics
- Founded: ca. 1974; 52 years ago
- Defunct: 1979
- Fate: Bankruptcy liquidation

The Digital Group was an early builder of microcomputers, formed in 1974 by Dick Bemis and Robert Suding, both of IBM. Their first product was a design for an improved version of the Intel 8008-based Mark-8, but over the next few years they introduced a number of new kit designs based on the Intel 8080, Motorola 6800 and MOS 6502. They were the first company to ship a Zilog Z80-based system when those processors appeared in 1976. They later introduced all-in-one designs with a custom case, but went out of business in 1979 before these became widely available.

== Inspiration ==
The Mark-8 was initially introduced in the June 1974 issue of Radio-Electronics magazine. Believing no one would be very interested, the editors suggested that the designer, Jon Titus, make the design as cheap as possible. This led to a number of design decisions that made the system very difficult to build. Notable among these was the way the printed circuit boards had to be hand-wired and then multiple boards hand-wired to each other to make the computer. These connections were notoriously unreliable. In contrast to the editor's conclusion no one would want them, Titus eventually sold 7,500 sets of plans and several hundred pre-build board sets.

Robert Suding was one of the people who purchased the complete kit, and managed to get it working over a period of about two weeks. Suding then went on to make several improvements to the design to address some of its problems, including the addition of seven-segment displays instead of individual lights, and later added television output and a keyboard input. In September 1974, Hal Singer and the students at the Cabrillo High School began printing the "Mark-8 User Group Newsletter". Suding got a list of the subscribers in Colorado and called them all and invited them to see his system.

== Formation ==
One of the people who visited was Dick Bemis from IBM in Denver. He convinced Suding to form a company with him and both of their wives to sell the plans for Suding's improved version of the Mark-8 with circuit diagrams for the video board and a cassette tape interface for mass storage. Calculating that they would have to sell 100 copies of the plans to break even, they eventually sold 575.

The January 1975 issue of Popular Electronics featured the Intel 8080-based Altair 8800. Like the Mark-8, it had a number of problems in the design and Suding began considering ways to sell into this new market. Bemis favoured the development of cards that fit into the Altair, a system that was later known as the S-100 bus, but Suding felt it that it was tied too closely to the 8080 and would tie them to that platform at a time when he knew other processor designs were coming out. He favoured the development of a platform-neutral bus because that way they could sell adaptor cards for peripherals that would work even if they swapped processors.

Shortly thereafter, Suding approached IBM management and demanded he be given a full-time engineering position now that he had his PhD. They stated there were no remaining transfers for that year, so Suding quit and worked at Digital Group full time.

== New processors ==
He soon adapted his system from the 8080 to the recently introduced Motorola 6800, designed by Chuck Peddle. Shortly after that, Peddle left Motorola to develop the MOS 6501, and Suding was able to get it working very quickly. He called Peddle to tell him this, and Peddle then showed up at his house with the design team, promising Suding anything he asked for if they would begin development with the new MOS 6502. The same sales visits then went on to meet with Steve Jobs and Steve Wozniak, who formed Apple Computer to sell their design.

Only a few weeks later, Suding read that the designer of the 8008 and 8080, Federico Faggin, had left Intel to introduce his own design, the Zilog Z80. They purchased several, which were trivially easy to adapt to the 8080-based systems. Although the Z80 was deliberately designed to be completely compatible with the 8080, it also featured a number of new instructions including 16-bit math. Suding re-wrote their software to make use of these features. They took their new Z80 machines to the National Computer Conference in New York City in June 1976, where Faggin was also showing the Z80. To Faggin's annoyance, the Digital Group booth was packed with people while Zilog's was empty.

While talking with Faggin at the conference, Suding noted that the various licensees of the 8080 design, Texas Instruments, National Semiconductor and AMD, had all introduced flaws that meant some of the instructions did not work correctly. He had found these flaws through trial and error and made a program that looked for them and could identify the chip based on which instructions didn't work properly. He ran it for the Z80 and it reported 100% compatibility, which was a great relief to Faggin.

== Expansion and collapse ==
By the end of 1977, the company had developed a smaller form-factor case for their machines to host the cards, giving them a more professional look than the earlier S-100 machines. These used a ROM containing boot code, which eliminated the need for front-panel switches and lights as seen on the competition. The resulting design was more similar to the original IBM PC than the large switch-festooned boxes of the Altair or IMSAI 8080.

By 1978, the company had grown to over 100 employees and quality control (QC) became a serious problem. Ken Jackson was hired to check that the machines actually worked, and he did so, causing the faulty machines to be rejected and causing a backup in the production. Bemis solved this problem not by improving production, but by firing Jackson. Later that year, Suding took over QC personally to fix the problems.

But by this time the company was in serious financial trouble. A number of high-profile failures in the market, notably Sphere Computer, caused the suppliers to only ship products on receipt of payment, no more 30-day terms. This produced an immediate cash crunch at Digital Group, who could no longer afford to purchase enough components to meet the needs of their orders. The company declared Chapter 11 in 1979 and formally shut down that summer.
