= Virginia Williamson =

Virginia Williamson (also Virginia Londner Green and Virginia Peschke) was the co-founder, owner and publisher of Byte magazine. She founded the magazine in 1975 together with her ex-husband, Wayne Green the founder/publisher of the amateur radio magazine 73. In early 1981, Byte magazine, under Williamson's leadership, became the only computer publication included in Folio’s prestigious Folio 400 list of the largest U.S. magazines. The magazine wasn’t just news—it published in-depth technical articles, schematics, and code listings.

Readers could build circuits, program in early languages, or experiment with hardware directly from the magazine.

This made it a favorite among engineers, hobbyists, and early software developers.

She sold the magazine to McGraw-Hill in 1979, but remained publisher until 1983. She later married Gordon Williamson, who in 1988 published a book about her ex-husband Wayne Green, titled See Wayne Run. Run, Wayne, Run. Williamson died in 2015.
