= Explorer/85 =

Netronics Explorer 85
- Also known as: Explorer/85
- Manufacturer: Netronics R&D Ltd.
- Type: Personal computer
- Released: 1979; 47 years ago
- Discontinued: 1984
- Operating system: Monitor ROM, Microsoft Basic, CPM
- CPU: Intel 8085 @ 3.072 MHz
- Memory: 256 B - 64 KB

The Netronics Explorer 85 was an Intel 8085 based computer produced by Netronics R&D Ltd. located in New Milford, Connecticut between 1979 and 1984. Netronics also produced the more well known ELF II computer, and the ill-fated Explorer 88 computer.

== Specifications ==
The Intel 8085 CPU used a 6.144 MHz crystal, resulting in the processor operating at 3.072 MHz. The basic system had 256 bytes of RAM and 2048 bytes of ROM. The base system also had cassette tape IO, serial IO which could be configured for RS-232 or current loop, and thirty eight bits of parallel IO. The system could be expanded to have from two to six S-100 bus sockets.

== Unique features ==
Although this computer did have an S-100 bus, it was different from most of its contemporary S-100 bus computers in that it had a large motherboard containing the CPU and associated circuitry, and only two S-100 bus sockets. The Sol-20 computer also had this arrangement.

Another unique feature of this computer was its serial port. The serial data was connected to the Intel 8085's SID and SOD (Serial In Data and Serial Out Data) pins. This allowed the use of the Intel 8085's RIM and SIM instructions to read the level on the SID and set the level on SOD line. What was so unique about this implementation was that after resetting the Explorer 85, the user had to press the space bar on the attached computer terminal. The Explorer 85's firmware would measure the time between the start bit and the first data bit in the ASCII code for the space character. This allowed the Explorer 85 to automatically calculate and match the baud rate of the terminal. The down side of this technique was that the firmware needed to be in a loop monitoring the level on the SID pin to receive data from the terminal. If the processor was doing some other task when the user pressed a key on the terminal, that data would be lost.

In addition to having a reset button on the front of the computer, the Explorer 85 had an interrupt button. This allow the user to interrupt a locked up program and return to the debugger, without resetting the computer and losing all of their work.

== Available configurations ==
The Explorer 85 was available at five different levels.

=== Level A ===
Level A was just the motherboard with no S-100 bus sockets loaded. This could be ordered with firmware configured for either a computer terminal, or for a hexadecimal keypad which was available from Netronics. The Level A configuration did not include a power supply, so the user had to provide their own eight volt power supply, or purchase one from Netronics. The Level A motherboard contained a prototyping area, where the user could add circuitry of their own design. In 1982 the Level A system sold for $129.95.

=== Level B ===
Level B added the circuitry to drive the two S-100 bus connectors which you could solder into the Level A motherboard. This allowed the owner to use any of the myriad of available S-100 bus on the market. In 1982 the Level B upgrade sold for $49.95, and $4.85 for each S-100 bus connector.

=== Level C ===
Level C was a card cage and S-100 bus expander card. This card would plug into one of the S-100 bus sockets on the motherboard. You could then plug up to five more S-100 bus cards into the expander card. One of the two original slots on the motherboard was still available for use, giving the Level C Explorer 85 a capacity of six S-100 bus cards. The card cage held all of the cards in place. In 1982 the Level C upgrade sold for $39.95, and $4.85 for each S-100 bus connector.

=== Level D ===
Level D was a RAM upgrade. This could take the form of up to 4k of RAM on the motherboard, or Netronics S-100 Jaws memory board. The Jaws memory board used from eight to thirty two 4116 16k by 1 bit dynamic random access memory chips, which could be added in groups of eight. The Jaws memory board used an Intel 8202 dynamic random access memory controller chip to refresh the memory, and multiplex the address bits. In 1982 the Level D upgrade sold for as little as $49.95 for the 4k motherboard upgrade, to as much as $299.95 for the 64k Jaws upgrade.

=== Level E ===
Level E activated the ROM sockets in the motherboard. This allowed the user to put custom programs in the ROM socket, or the user could purchase a Microsoft ROM BASIC interpreter from Netronics. The Microsoft ROM BASIC could store and load programs using a cassette tape recorder. In 1982 the Level E upgrade sold for as little as $5.95.
