= Q1 Corporation =

American computer manufacturer

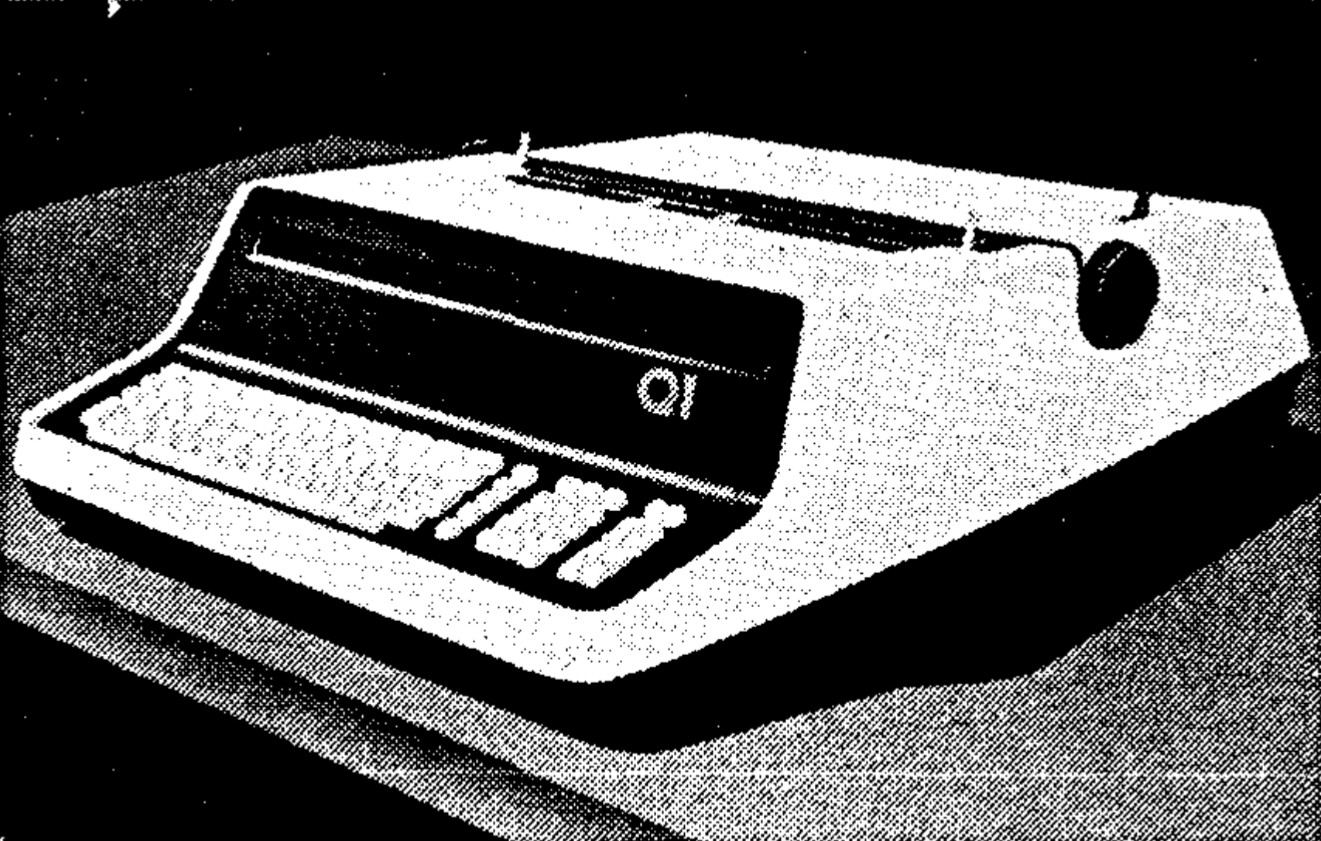
- The desktop console of an original 1972 Q1/T microcomputer, as depicted in the February 1973 issue of Datamation magazine.
- Industry: Computer manufacturing
- Founded: 1971
- Founder: Daniel Alroy
- Defunct: 1974
- Fate: Acquired by Nixdorf Computer AG
- Headquarters: New York, NY, USA,

Q1 Corporation was an American computer company founded in 1971 by Daniel Alroy. Its main focus was the manufacturing and sale of early microcomputers, beginning in 1972.

== Products ==
=== Q1/T and Q1/C (First generation) ===
The first generation Q1/T computer was first sold in 1972. It was based on the Intel 8008 microprocessor, designed to run PL/I, and had a memory of between 4 and 16 kilobytes, available in increments of 4K. The desktop console contained an alphanumeric keyboard, one-line 80-character Burroughs plasma display, and a Xerox Diablo HyType I printer capable of plotting graphs. A separate desk-sized unit contained the microprocessor, memory, I/O interfaces, all other logic. Storage was originally achieved with magnetic cards, which had a capacity of 10K.

The first Q1/T was delivered on December 11th, 1972 to the Litcom Division of Litton Industries. Its introduction was announced in several computer and electronics magazines in early 1973, with the 4K base model costing $10,000 and higher-memory models up to $20,000. According to one of the articles, Q1 Corp. was "considering use of a new Intel processor chip, the 8080," which at that time was over a year away from production.

Another first generation Q1 system was delivered in February 1973, and that same year systems were installed in Germany and Hong Kong. According to a February 1973 article in Datamation, "the vendor [Q1] says initial customers have received their units," further supporting that at least two systems had already been installed. First generation Q1 computers were also distributed in Taiwan by Taiwan Automation Co.

Due to the system being completely pre-built and its intention for small credit unions and other accounting businesses, the price and popularity of the system did not match those of other early microcomputers that were sold in kit form. However, this and the bundled productivity programs, which at launch included a business programming language and accounting software, made the system much more attractive for practical business use instead of as a hobby project. According to a Datapro report, Q1 had delivered 10 units in the U.S. by March 1974.

A later first generation model, the Q1/C, was capable of addressing up to 64K of memory, with the base model starting at 16K. The Q1/C used dual IBM 3740-compatible floppy disks drives, capable of storing about 262 kilobytes of data per disk. Up to 6 desktop consoles and 4 floppy drives could be handled by one Q1/C desk unit.

External printers, hard disk drives, and teletype interfaces were also available for first generation Q1 systems.

=== Q1/LMC (Second generation) ===
The second generation Q1/LMC (sometimes retroactively referred to as the Q1/Lite) was based on the Intel 8080 processor and was first sold in 1974. The desktop Q1/LMC included a printer, two floppy drives, an alphanumeric keyboard, and a multi-line flat-panel plasma display.

The first pre-production Q1/LMC was delivered to the Israeli Air Force in April 1974, the same month that the Intel 8080 was introduced. In June 1974, several more Q1/LMC systems were ordered; the original pre-production Q1/LMC was returned to Q1, and the first production units were shipped in August 1974.

=== Q1/Lite (Third generation) ===
The third generation Q1/Lite was designed by 1977. It was based on the then-unreleased Intel 8800 processor, which would go on to become Intel's iAPX 432. The desktop computer unit contained the same peripherals as the previous generation in a slightly different case. Independent workstations were also available, which each had their own processor, memory, resident OS, keyboard and plasma display, but no printer or floppy drives.

This product did not see commercial release, since the Intel 8800 was delayed by several years. Development of a new system shifted to the Z80.

=== Q1 and Q1/Lite (Fourth generation) ===
The fourth generation Q1/Lite was available sometime after 1976. It was based on the Zilog Z80 processor. The printer was separated into an external enclosure, not part of either the desk unit nor the workstation.

At one point, a different design for the fourth generation Q1/Lite workstation was introduced, being very similar to the design of the second generation Q1/Lite. This design had two variants, one with a printer (marketed as the Q1) and one without (marketed as the Q1/Lite). These variants were also marketed as the MicroLite and MicroLite II.

The Q1/Lite and MicroLite also supported CP/M, along with Q1's proprietary operating system.

Following a 1974 evaluation and recommendation by Computer Sciences Corp., fourth generation Q1/Lites were also installed at all eleven NASA bases between 1977 and 1979.

=== Other products ===
Q1 offered several peripherals for their computers, including floppy drives, hard drives, tape drives, and printers.

A Q1 Basic Office Machine was also designed and prototyped, although it never reached commercial production.

Q1 had also introduced the Q1-68000, a Motorola 68000-based computer, by 1981. The Q1-68000 ran a UNIX-compatible operating system, included 256K of memory built into the computer expandable to 2.2 megabytes, a 20-megabyte hard drive, floppy and backup tape drives, a large 24-inch color CRT, and networking capabilities. The Q1-68000 cost between $13,000 and $500,000 depending on the quantity and configuration, with the optional networking capability, Qnet, costing an additional $1,000.

=== Q1/Lite Emulator ===
Currently no fully functioning Q1/Lite units are known to survive, although restorations of broken units are currently underway. However, since 2024, a Q1/Lite emulation project has been ongoing under the auspices of the Danish Computer History Museum (Dansk Datahistorisk Forening).

This project has used copies of dumped EEPROMS from several Q1/Lite units, digitized floppy disk images, and a Z80 emulator to create a working virtual Q1/Lite.

The emulator has basic support for the display, floppy disks, keyboard, and printer. A few of the 200+ disks that have been preserved can be loaded into the emulator, and programs can be executed. One of the disks contains a PL/I compiler that has been shown to compile a simple demo program to calculate numbers in the Fibonacci sequence.
