= ComPAN 8 =

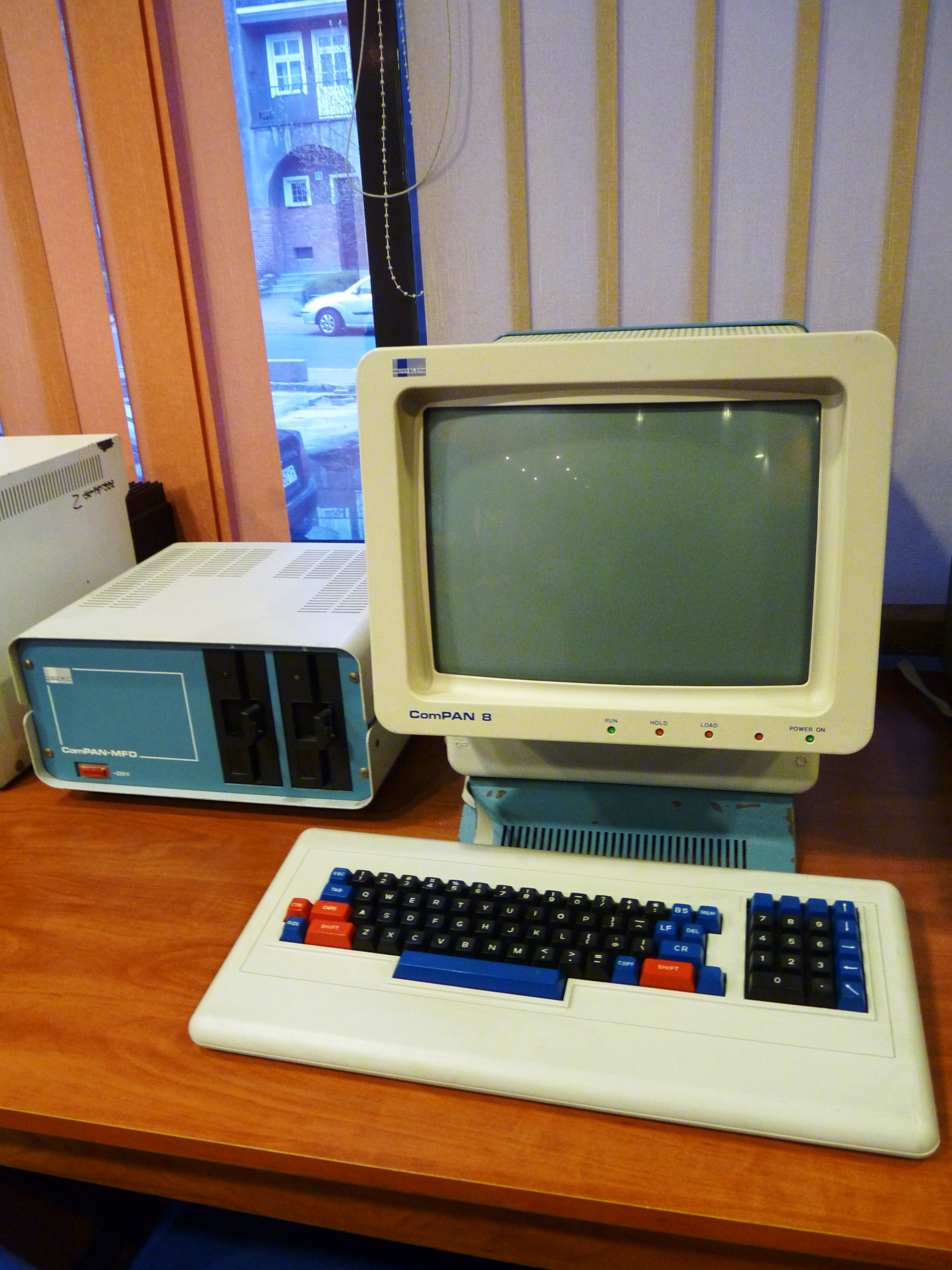
ComPan 8 computer at the Museum of Computer History and Computer Science in Katowice

ComPAN 8 is an 8-bit Polish microcomputer produced in the 1980s at the MERA-ELZAB factory in Zabrze, Poland. ComPAN 8 was designed at the Institute of Industry Automation Systems PAN in Gliwice.

== Technical description ==
- Processor: 8080A or 8085 2 MHz
- Interrupt controller: 8 levels
- Address bus: extended by 5 additional lines (A16..AA20), max. 2 MB of memory
- RAM: 64 KB
- ROM: 8 KB
- Keyboard: 83 keys MERA 7926M with numerical part
- Floppy disk controller: 8- or 5,25-inch
- Interfaces: 2× RS-232C, parallel port, printer interface circuit
- Monochromatic display, divided into 2 (or 3) windows:
  - system window: 4 lines, 80 characters on the bottom of the screen
  - workspace window:
    - 24×80 characters – text mode
    - 30×80 characters – graphical-text mode
    - 288×240 pixels – graphical mode
  - additional system window (optional): 8 lines with 30 characters on the top of screen

== Software ==
- Operation system:
  - CP/M (more popular)
  - ISIS-II
- programming languages
  - macroassembler
  - Pascal
  - Fortran
  - PL/M (ISIS-II)
