= ELF II =

1978 microcomputer trainer kit by RCA

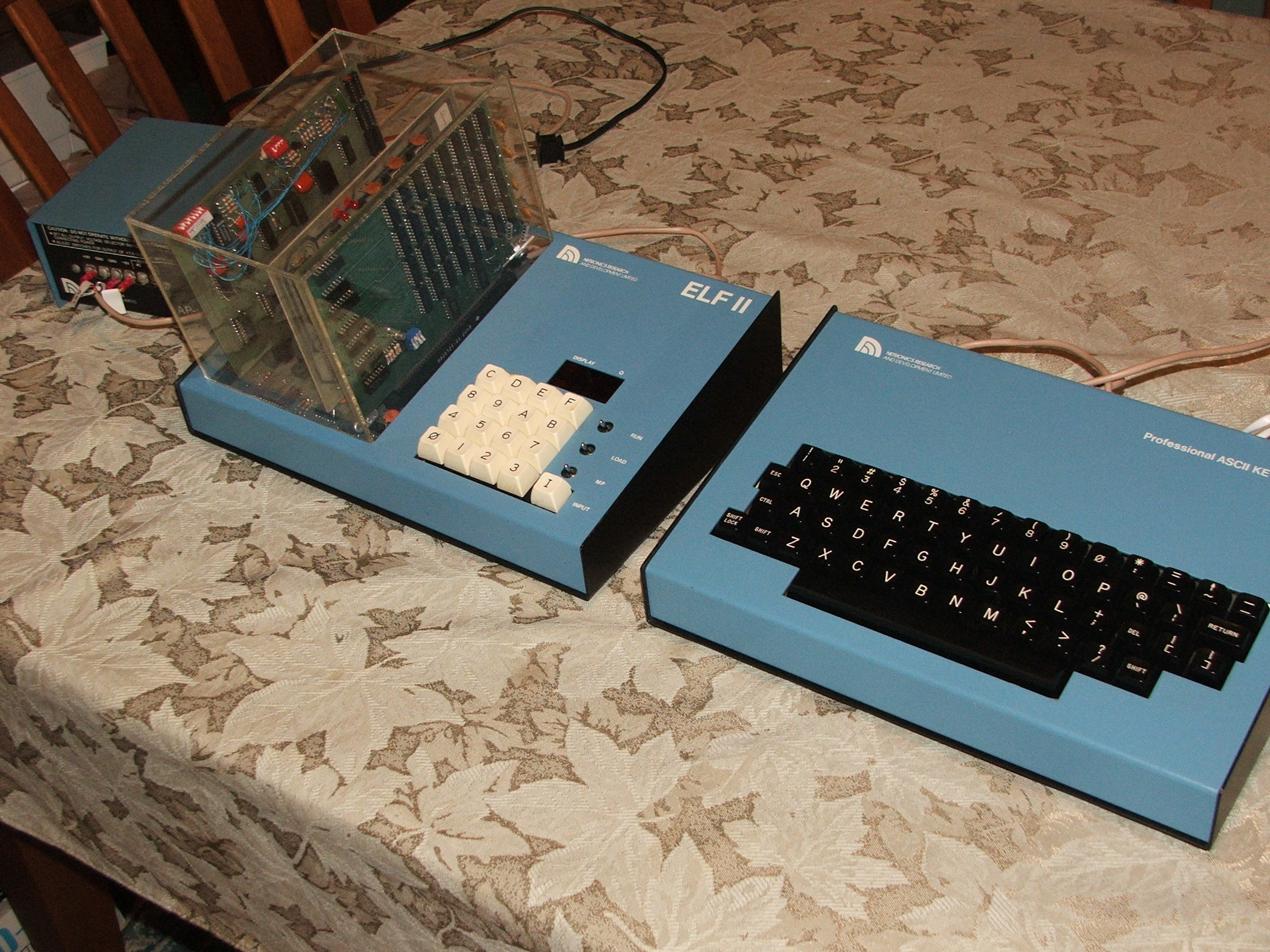
- Manufacturer: Netronics
- Type: Hobbyist computer
- Released: 1978; 48 years ago
- Operating system: Monitor ROM
- CPU: 8-bit RCA 1802
- Memory: 256 bytes to 64 KB via 4 KB or 16 KB memory expansion cards
- Storage: Cassette Tape
- Removable storage: 4 KB or 16 KB static RAM memory cards
- Display: none
- Graphics: 64x32 pixels, monochrome, NTSC TV output
- Camera: none
- Touchpad: HEX keypad
- Power: external power supply

The Netronics ELF II was an early microcomputer trainer kit featuring the RCA 1802 microprocessor, 256 bytes of RAM, DMA-based bitmap graphics, hexadecimal keypad, two-digit hexadecimal LED display, a single "Q" LED, and 5 expansion slots. The system was developed and sold by Netronics Research and Development Limited in New Milford, CT, USA.

== Hardware ==
Available hardware accessories included:

- The "Giant Board" (ROM monitor, serial and parallel I/O, Cassette interface)
- 4 KB and 16 KB (static) RAM boards
- Low-resolution color graphics board
- "Full BASIC" board with BASIC preloaded in ROM chips
- EPROM burner board
- External power supply
- Attractive, heavy-duty metal cases for the CPU and power supply

== Software ==
Available software included:

- Tiny BASIC (integer BASIC interpreter)
- Text Editor
- Full BASIC (floating point BASIC interpreter using Reverse Polish Notation)

== Notable features ==
- Unlike similar "bare circuit card" trainer/experimenter computers of the day, the ELF II could be easily expanded thanks to its built-in bus.
- Memory mapped TV graphics was provided in the base kit by the CDP1861 "Pixie-Graphics" chip. Pixels were large. With unexpanded 256 byte memory, the interrupt routine needed to service the chip showed on the screen.
- The "Full BASIC" ROM card provided an RPN calculator chip as a simple and low-cost math coprocessor. As a result, floating point operations were an order of magnitude faster than what was possible in software. However, the BASIC syntax for math was non-standard as it used postfix RPN (see code example below). Historically, this was also the heyday of Hewlett-Packard calculators, so it was a fair bet that any technically-minded person willing to assemble a computer either already knew RPN or could easily learn it and adapt.
  10 REM This program will print the number 30
20 A=10,B=20
30 C=A#B+
40 PRINT C
50 END
  In the code above, the "#" symbol is equivalent to the "Enter" key on a RPN calculator.

== Netronics video terminal ==
Netronics also offered:

- An ASCII keyboard kit
- Heavy-duty metal keyboard case
- Video terminal card kit (monochrome text, 16 lines by 64 characters, upper & lower case)

The keyboard could be used alone to generate ASCII parallel codes. The video terminal card fits underneath the keyboard in the optional case to form a stand-alone video terminal sending and receiving serial ASCII. Either configuration could be interfaced to the ELF II through the Giant Board. The terminal kits were also marketed independently of the ELF II.

== The name ==
The ELF part of the name came from an earlier machine called the "COSMAC Elf", published as a construction project in Popular Electronics magazine. Improvements on its predecessor included an etched PCB, a hexadecimal keypad instead of toggle switches for program entry, the RCA CDP1861 Pixie-graphics chip, and the 5 slot 86-line bus for expansion cards.

== See also ==
- COSMAC Elf
- RCA COSMAC VIP
- Quest SuperELF
- RCA 1802 microprocessor
- Early Microcomputers
- Competing 6502 microprocessor based trainers KIM-1 and Rockwell AIM-65
- 8080 Based machines: MITS Altair 8800 and IMSAI 8080
- RCA Studio II
