= Sphere 1 =

Personal computer released in 1975

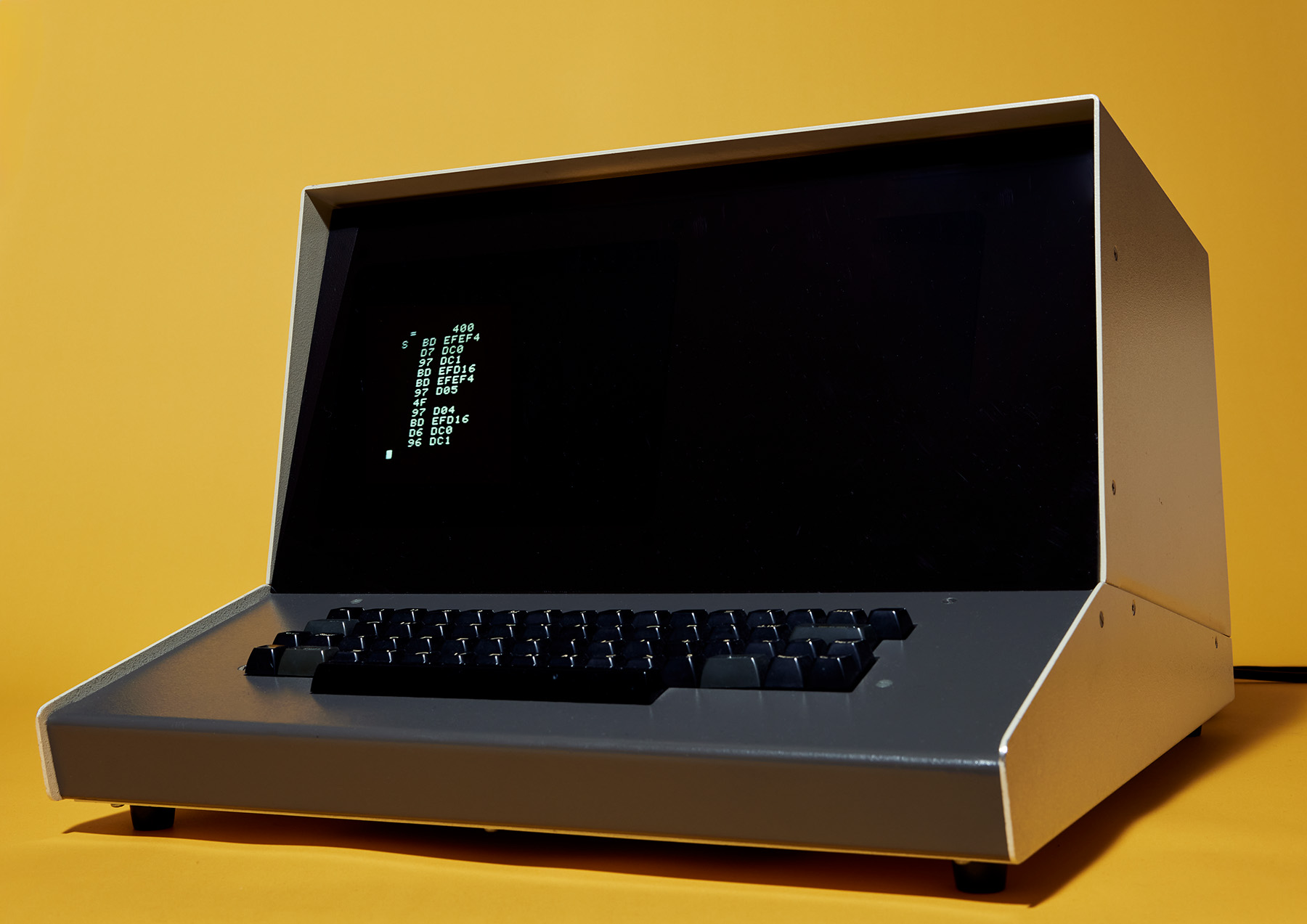
- Sphere 300 series computer system
- Developer: Michael Donald Wise
- Manufacturer: Sphere Corporation
- Released: 1975
- Introductory price: US$860 (Kit:Sphere 1)
- Discontinued: 1977
- Units sold: 1,300
- Operating system: "PDS" 1 KB Basic
- CPU: Motorola 6800
- Memory: 4 KB of RAM (Expandable to 64 KB), 1 KB PROM
- Display: 16 lines x 32 characters, CRT monitor
- Input: keyboard with a numeric keypad

The Sphere 1 was a personal computer completed in 1975 by Michael Donald Wise and Monroe Tyler of Sphere Corporation, of Bountiful, Utah. The Sphere 1 featured a Motorola 6800 CPU, onboard ROM, a full-sized CRT monitor, 4 KB of RAM, and a keyboard with a numeric keypad.

The Sphere 1 was among the earliest complete all-in-one microcomputers that could be plugged in, turned on, and was fully functional. Michael touted it as the first "true PC" because it had a keyboard, a number pad, a monitor, external storage, and did not run on a punch tape. In this respect, it is pre-dated by the 1973 MCM/70, among others, but the Sphere included a full-sized display that these generally lacked. When BYTE Magazine did its annual history of the computer, it always included Sphere 1, showing that prior microcomputers lacked the user I/O interface built into the Sphere 1.

The Sphere 1 also included a keyboard-operated reset feature consisting of two keys wired in series that sent a reset signal to the CPU triggering a hard reboot. Wise considered this to be the first keyboard activated reset – a predecessor to the now-common Control-Alt-Delete combination.

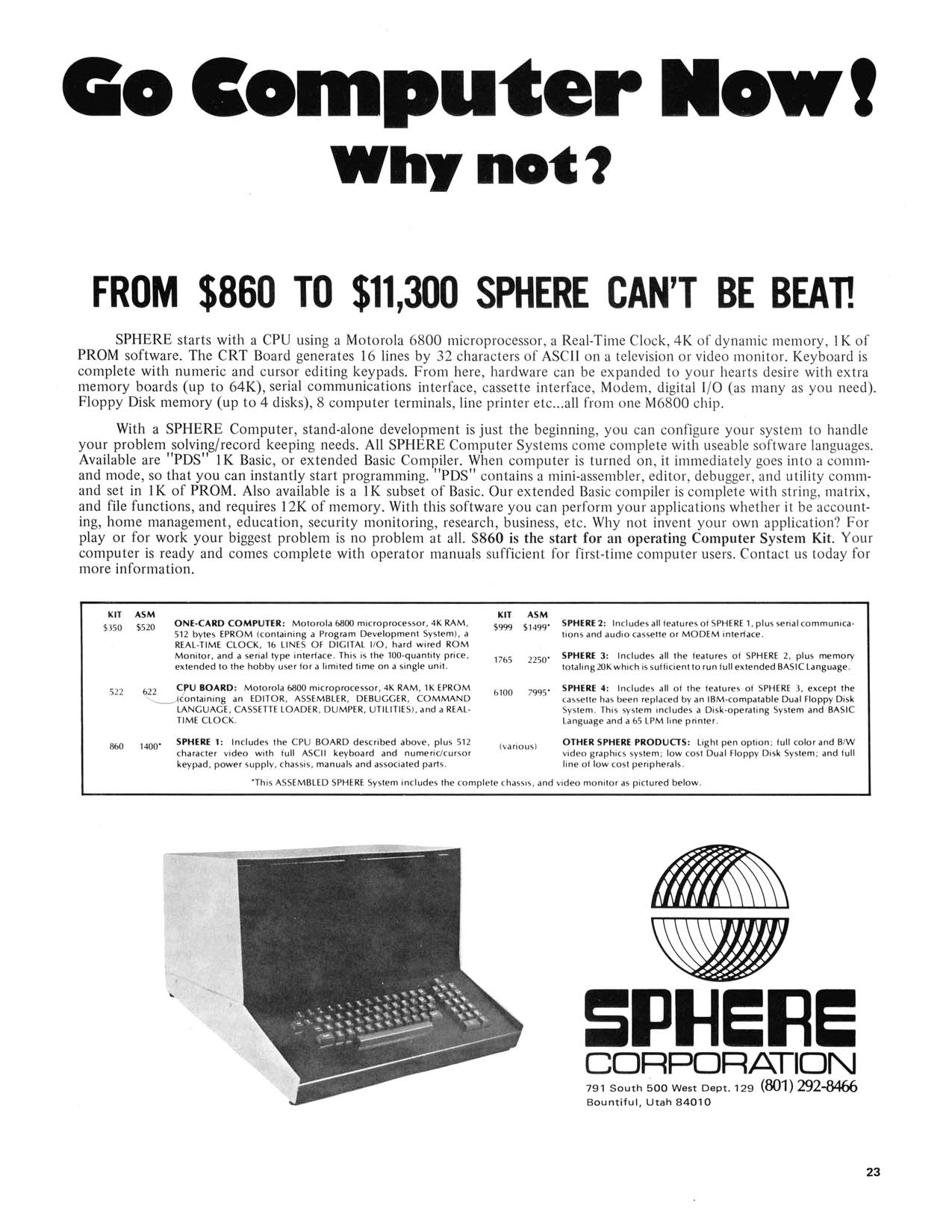
Sphere Personal Computer Ad January 1976

It is not clear how many systems were sold; production models were sent to computer stores, but the company disappeared shortly thereafter.
