= MCM/70 =

1970s microcomputer

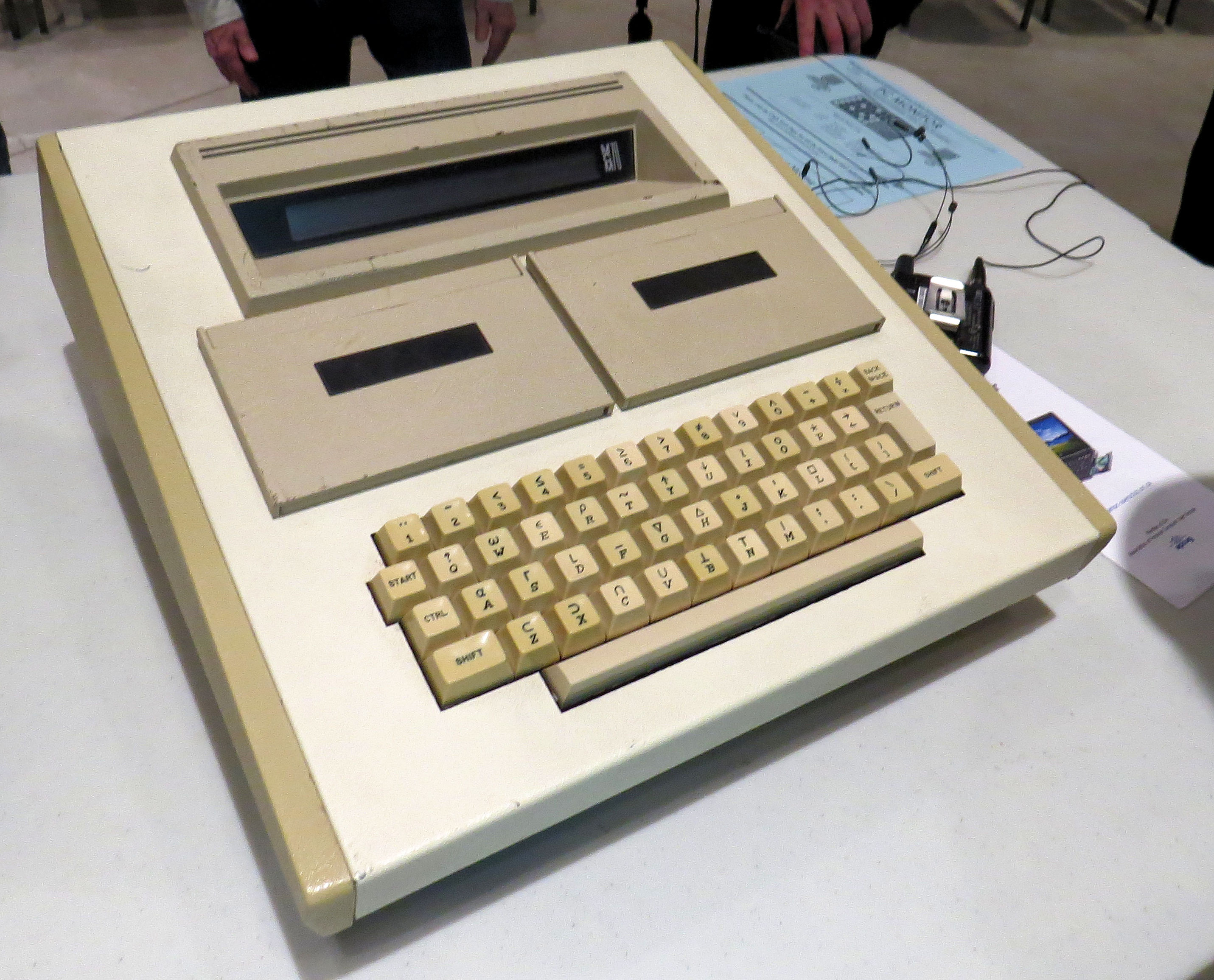
- MCM Model 70 microcomputer, 1974
- Manufacturer: MCM Computers
- Released: 1974; 52 years ago
- Media: Cassette tape
- Operating system: APL language
- CPU: Intel 8008 @ 0.8 MHz
- Memory: 2 to 8 KB
- Display: Alphanumeric single line display
- Weight: 9 kg

The MCM/70 is a pioneering microcomputer first built in 1973 in Toronto, Ontario, Canada, and released the next year. This makes it one of the first microcomputers in the world, the second to be shipped in completed form, and the first portable computer. The MCM/70 was the product of Micro Computer Machines, one of three related companies set up in Toronto in 1971 by Mers Kutt. It is considered by some historians to be the first usable personal microcomputer system.

== Early history ==
Kutt, a professor of mathematics at Queen's University in Kingston, Ontario, during the late 1960s, noted that the efficiency of computer users there was hampered by the long wait times involved in submitting programs in punched card form for batch processing by a shared mainframe computer. In 1968, Kutt and Donald Pamenter started a firm, Consolidated Computer Inc., and began to produce a data-entry device named Key-Edit. This was a low-cost terminal, with a one-line display device, which bypassed the need for keypunching.

In 1971, Kutt, no longer part of CCI, began planning a machine to support software development in the recently developed programming language APL. APL was best programmed using a custom keyboard and these were very rare at the time. He initially named his design the Key-Cassette; similar in design and concept to Key-Edit, it would offer editing ability and support for either two cassette decks or one cassette and an acoustic coupler to upload programs to other machines.

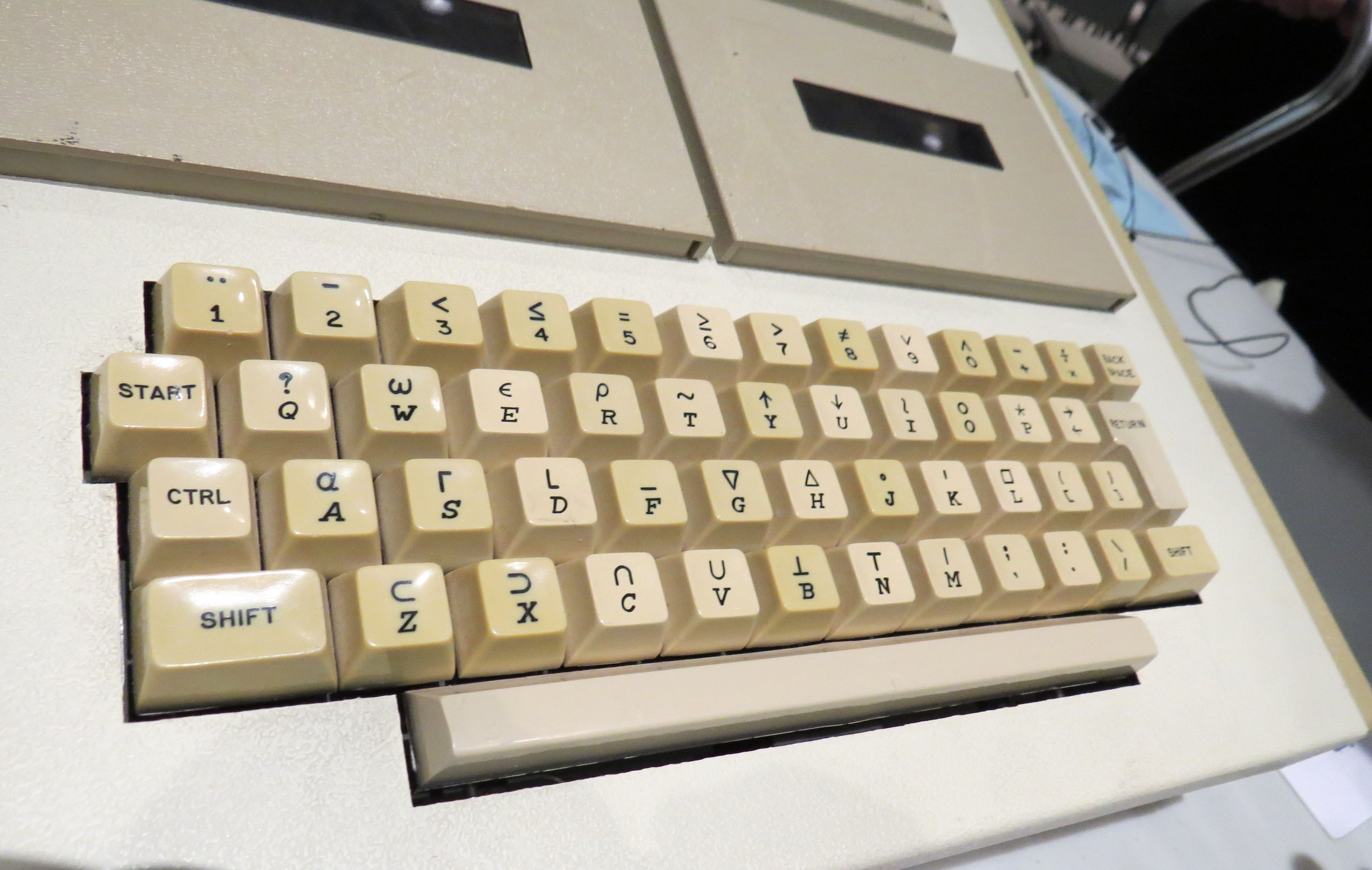
MCM Model 70 microcomputer 1974 APL keyboard

The original design resembled a desktop electronic calculator. Kutt's notes of the era showed his intent to use the cover and display from an extant calculator with a modified power supply, to include a small keyboard with 32 keys, and a display made of either 13 or 15 segmented LEDs. Kutt also created a company, Micro Computer Machines, which would later manufacture the devices.

== Development ==
Through his acquaintance with Intel founder Robert Noyce, Kutt had been following Intel's work on the 1201, an 8-bit microprocessor later renamed the Intel 8008. The processor was scheduled to be complete in late 1971, but its release was delayed until spring. In December 1971, Kutt incorporated a technology development company, Kutt Systems. He signed an agreement with Intel to supply an Intel 4004, a SIM4- 01 development system, supporting chips from the MCS-4 chipset, and an MP7-01 EPROM programmer to his new company. This equipment was used for early development work until the 8008 was available.

Kutt hired programmer Gord Ramer, and the two began work on developing Kutt's concept. In May 1972, Kutt Systems received one of the earliest SIM8-01 kits. The team, now including hardware engineer José Laraya, software engineer André Arpin, and two APL programmers, Don Genner and Morgan Smyth, started to build what was then termed the M/C, for microcomputer. By then, the design had expanded to include a complete keyboard, a chiclet design similar to the ones used on early models of the Commodore PET, and a Burroughs Self-Scan 32-character display. Unlike the earlier Key-Edit system, the M/C would allow entering and executing APL programs.

Dissatisfied with the SIM8 equipment, the Kutt Systems staff built a motherboard from scratch, including an Omniport, an 8008-expansion bus. Meanwhile, work on porting an APL interpreter to the system continued, using an 8008 emulator written in Fortran named INTERP/8. The system, mocked up in breadboard form, was first displayed publicly on 11 November 1972 at the Kutt offices in Kingston, Ontario. In May 1973, the same system was shown at the APL Users' Conference in Toronto, now encased in fibreglass. The completed design, in its new injection moulded case, was demonstrated for the press on 25 September 1973.

== Specifications ==
The MCM/70, manufactured by Micro Computer Machines in Kingston, was encased in a wedge-shaped metal box about half a metre on a side, with a keyboard at the front, a compact audio cassette tape recorder(s) in the middle, and a one-line plasma display at the top. The MCM/70 had a one-line display and alphanumeric keyboard, and optionally had a second tape drive. It resembled desktop calculators of the time, such as HP 9830A.

An APL interpreter was built into the read-only memory (ROM), and the machine included a battery which allowed it time to save the workspace automatically when it was turned off. The MCM/70 weighed 20 pounds (9 kg) and shipped with up to 8 kilobytes of RAM and zero, one, or two cassette drives.

== Release ==
The first complete systems were shipped to dealers in the autumn of 1974. The basic unit, model 720 with an 800 kHz 8008, 2 KB RAM and no cassette drive sold for $4,950 Canadian (at the time the dollar was about equal to the US dollar). The fully equipped model 782 with 8 KB and two drives was $9,800, and was the only model that sold well.

At the time, the machine was already officially being called a "personal computer". The first manuals contain a personal note from Kutt to future customers, "But the simplicity of the MCM/70 and its associated computer language...make personal computer use and ownership a reality... Enjoy the privilege of having your own personal computer."

The MCM/70 was sold mainly to companies and government institutions with the need to make complex calculations and mathematical analysis. MCM's customers ranged from hospitals and insurance companies to NASA and the United States Army.

== Later development ==
In 1975, the computer was rereleased with no changes as the MCM/700. Also released that year were a punched card reader, plotter, and several programs. The MCM/800 followed in 1976. It was faster, included 16 KB RAM, and included the ability to drive an external monitor. Virtual memory was supported on all of the machines, although using cassettes for storage made it slow.

Released in 1978, MCM/900 was faster yet, included 24 KB RAM, and included a monitor. The MCM/1000, also called the MCM Power was a repackaged /900, and was later repackaged again as the MCM MicroPower. The bigger change for the /900 and /1000 was to support the HDS-10 disk server, which included an 8.4 MB 8-inch Shugart hard drive, an 8-inch floppy disk drive, and a 64 k Zilog Z80 to control it. Up to eight /900s or /1000s could be plugged into the HDS-10.

== Demise and legacy ==
By the late 1970s, after selling several hundred units, MCM was facing competition from several home computer systems with the same computing power as their own machines. Although they were designing another more advanced microcomputer, termed A*2, the funding needed for rapid development was unavailable. By 1983, the firm had ceased operating.

Rights to the in-progress A*2 design were sold to Ampex. They worked on the design for about a year before also ceasing development. This machine, called Sysmo, was sold in France by Sysmo company from 1975. This start-up was funded in Paris by Michel Carlier, an engineer who had invested also in MCM, with his own capital. However, the machine was sold for management applications while it was programmed with a complex scientific language (APL) much better adapted to scientific and technical fields; Sysmo company filed for bankruptcy in 1978. The stock of MCM/Sysmo was bought by French company Generale d'Electricite (later Alcatel) for its own use because of the product's mathematical computing features.

In 2011, York University professor Zbigniew Stachniak published a book about the development of the MCM/70, titled Inventing the PC: The MCM/70 Story. A collection of papers, illustrations and hardware related to the device have been included in the York University Computer Museum.

== See also ==
- SCELBI
- Mark-8
- Micral
- Datapoint 2200
