= SCELBI =

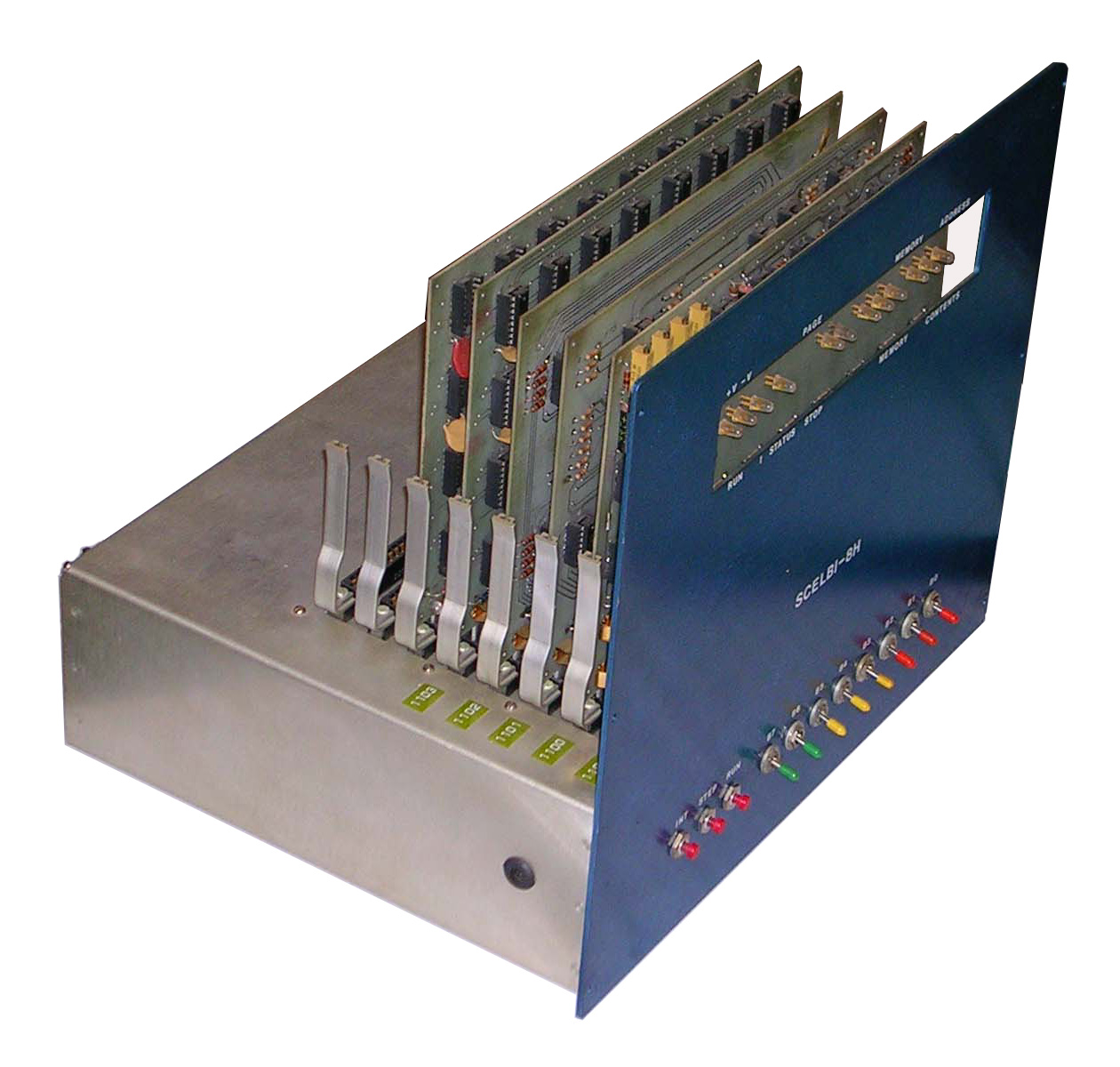
SCELBI computer, showing card cage construction and front panel toggle switches and LEDs.

SCELBI was an early model of microcomputer based on the Intel 8008 processor. The company SCELBI (derived from SCientific-ELectronics-BIology) Computer Consulting in 1973, by Nat Wadsworth. The SCELBI 8H was marketed in 1974 and was delivered either as an assembled unit or as a kit, with five basic circuit boards and provision for memory expansion to 16 KB (16,384 bytes). The company offered input/output devices including a keyboard, teleprinter interface, alphanumeric oscilloscope interface, and a cassette tape interface for data storage. The basic system only used a front panel with 11 switches and LEDs for input and output.

The company also offered a version of the BASIC programming language called SCELBAL. Optional modules for strings and transcendental functions allowed the system to operate in small memory configurations. SCELBAL was sold in book format, allowing it to be used on any similar 8008 or 8080 based platform.

The initial model 8H was discontinued at the end of 1974 and an improved model 8B was introduced. Fewer than 150 board sets and assembled systems were ever sold. Later in 1975, the availability of systems based on the more flexible 8080 processor reduced demand for the slower 8008-based product. The company discovered that the demand for books on microcomputers was very high and published several books; the publishing business was sold in 1982.

== See also ==
- Mark-8
- MCM/70
- Micral
- List of early microcomputers
