= Mark-8 =

Computer

The July 1974 issue of Radio-Electronics: "Build The Mark-8: Your Personal Minicomputer"

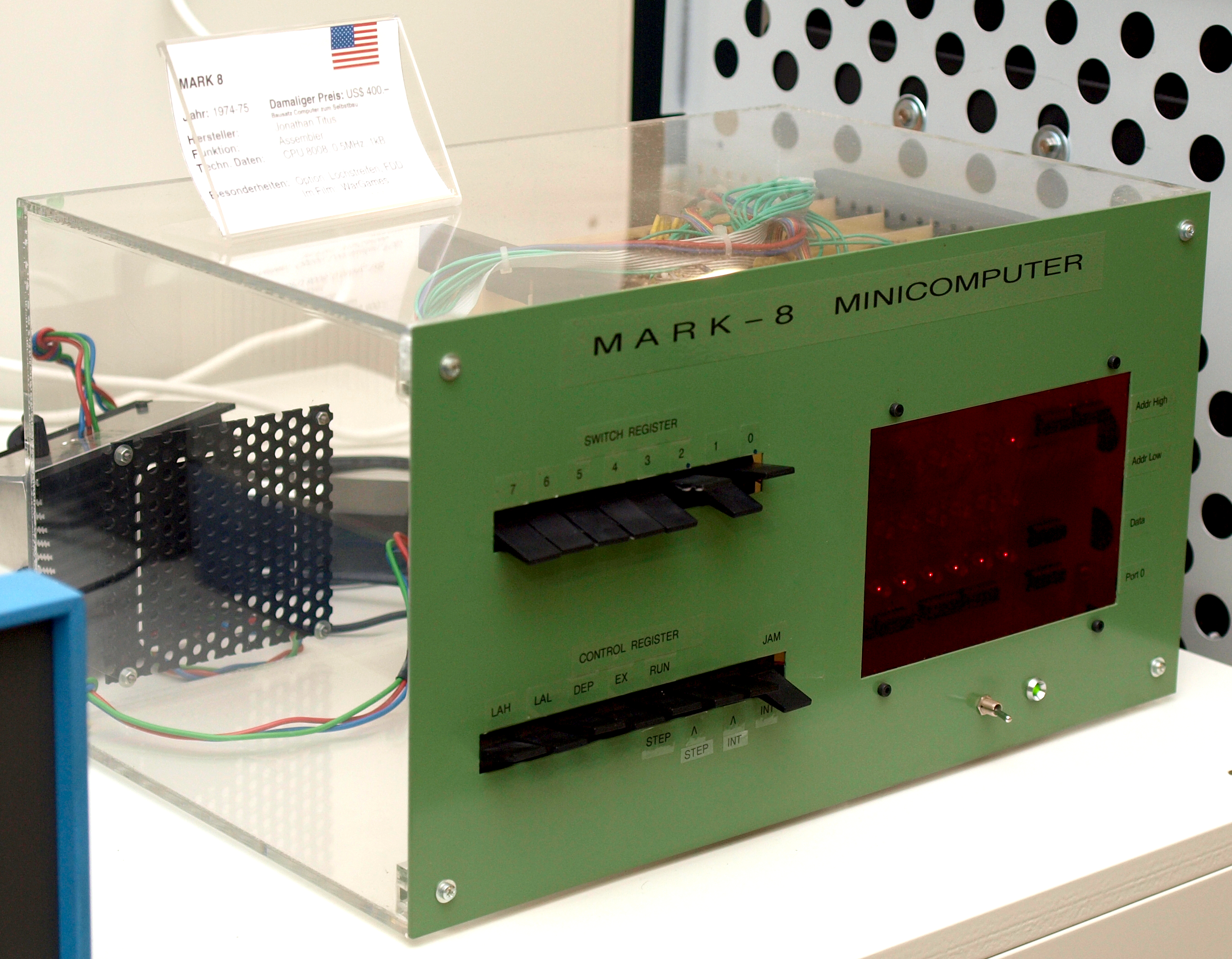
A working Mark-8 at Enter Technikwelt Solothurn

The Mark-8 is a microcomputer design from 1974, based on the Intel 8008 CPU (which was the world's first 8-bit microprocessor). The Mark-8 was designed by Jonathan Titus, a Virginia Tech graduate student in chemistry. After building the machine, Titus decided to share its design with the community and reached out to Radio-Electronics and Popular Electronics. He was turned down by Popular Electronics, but Radio-Electronics was interested and announced the Mark-8 as a 'loose kit' in the July 1974 issue of Radio-Electronics magazine.

== Project kit ==
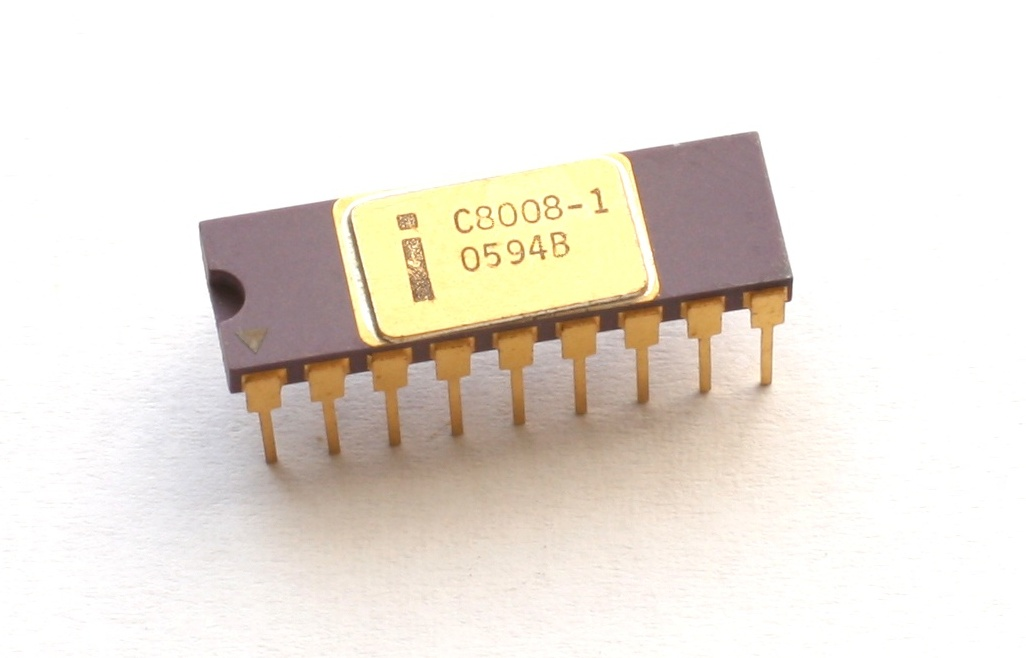
Intel 8008 CPU

The Mark-8 was introduced as a 'build it yourself' project in Radio-Electronics's July 1974 cover article, offering a US$5 (equivalent to $30 in 2025) booklet containing circuit board layouts and DIY construction project descriptions, with Titus himself arranging for US$50 (equivalent to $300 in 2025) circuit board sets to be made by a New Jersey company for delivery to hobbyists. Prospective Mark-8 builders had to gather the various electronics parts themselves from various sources. A couple of thousand booklets and some one hundred circuit board sets were eventually sold.

The Mark-8 was introduced in Radio-Electronics as "Your Personal Minicomputer" as the word 'microcomputer' was still far from being commonly used for microprocessor-based computers. In their announcement of their computer kit, the editors placed the Mark-8 in the same category as the era's other minicomputer computers. As quoted by an Intel official publication: "The Mark-8 is known as one of the first computers for the home."

== Influences ==
Although not very successful commercially, the Mark-8 prompted the editors of Popular Electronics magazine to consider publishing a similar but more easily accessible microcomputer project, and just six months later, in January 1975, they went through with their plans announcing the Altair 8800.

According to a 1998 Virginia Tech University article, Titus' Mark-8 microcomputer now resides in the Smithsonian Institution's "Information Age" display.

== See also ==
- Microcomputer
- Minicomputer
- SCELBI
- MCM/70
- Micral
