= Development kit =

A development kit is a collection of software or hardware tools for aiding computer programmers in developing new software. The term often refers specifically to a software development kit (SDK), which is a collection of software development tools in one installable package.

Development kit may also refer to:

- Game development kit, a set of hardware and software for developing video games for game consoles
- Microprocessor development board, a printed circuit board containing a microprocessor and support circuitry for development purposes
  - Intel system development kit, a series of microprocessor development kits made by Intel
- Java Development Kit, a distribution of the Java programming language and environment from Oracle
- Windows Driver Kit, a software toolset from Microsoft that supports developing device drivers for Microsoft Windows

== See also ==
- The dictionary definition of development kit at Wiktionary
