= ACFA =

ACFA may refer to:

- Arizona Consumer Fraud Act of 1967, the legislation giving consumer protections
- American Cat Fanciers Association, the cat pedigree and championship non-profit founded in 1955
- Association canadienne-française de l'Alberta, an association to support French-speaking Canadians in Alberta
- ACFA-8 (Affordable Computers for All-8), a microcomputer based on the Motorola 6808 released in 1979
