= MEK6800D2 =

Development board for Motorola 6800 microprocessor

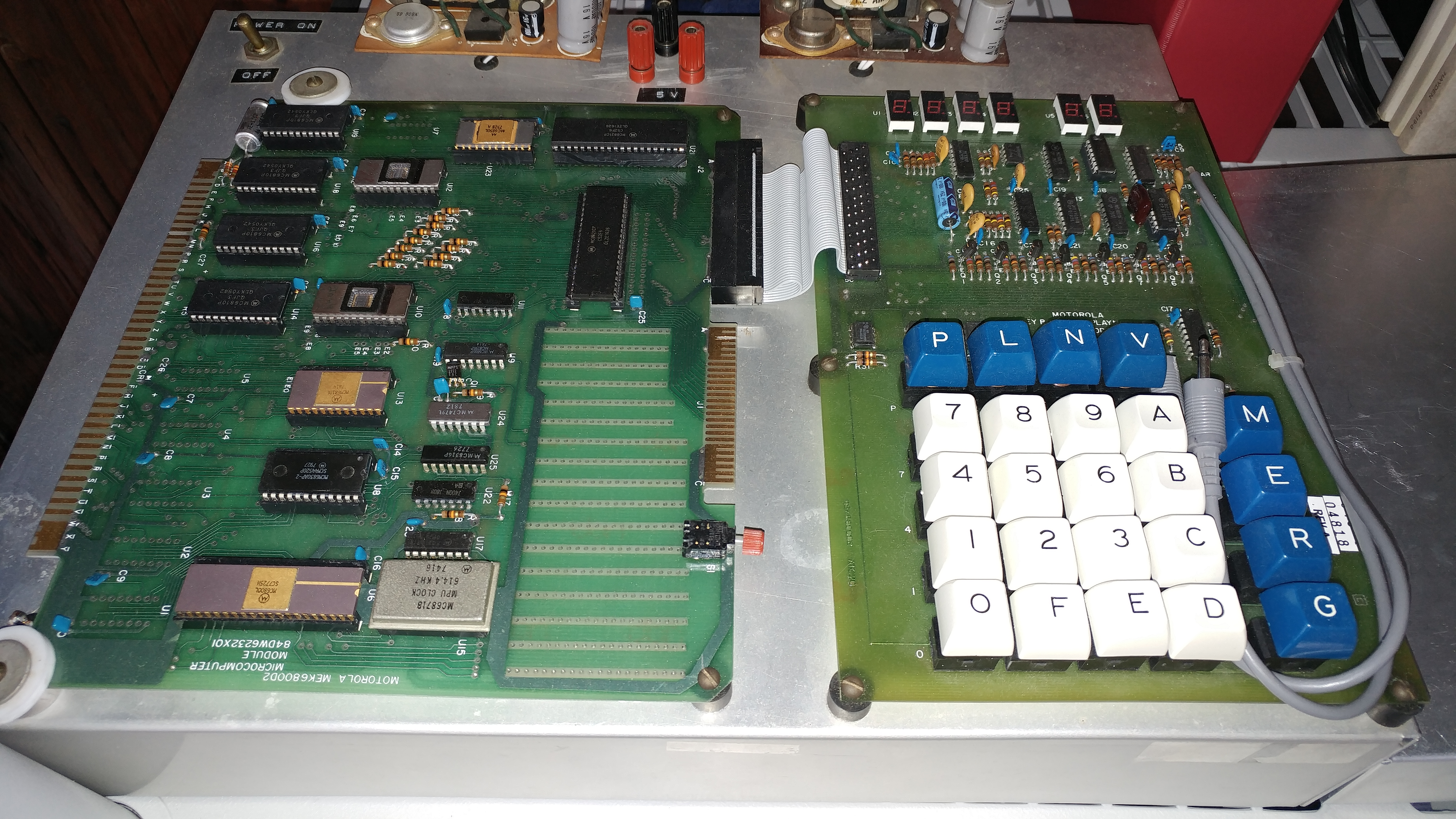
A Motorola MEK6800D2 Microcomputer, circa 1976. This microcomputer is based on a Motorola MC6800 8-bit microprocessor. The board on the left is the Microcomputer module containing the 6800 microprocessor, along with memory and I/O devices. The board on the right is the Keyboard/Display module containing a hexadecimal keypad, function keys, and 7-segment LED displays for displaying a 16-bit address and 8-bit data.

The MEK6800D2 was a development board for the Motorola 6800 microprocessor, produced by Motorola in 1976. It featured a keyboard with hexadecimal keys and an LED display, but also featured an RS-232 asynchronous serial interface for a Teletype or other terminal. Data and programs could be loaded from and saved to an audio cassette tape. There was an on-board monitor program called JBUG (analogous to an operating system on a modern computer) fitted in a 1K byte ROM, and the maximum RAM capacity on board was 512 bytes, but this could be expanded via the Motorola EXORciser computer bus interface.

The hardware consisted of two circuit boards. The keyboard-display module contained a 16 key (hexadecimal) data entry section, and eight function keys labeled M, E, R, G, V, N, L, and Pl along with a 6 hex digit LED display. The keyboard-display board connected to the microcomputer module by a 50-conductor ribbon cable.

There was also a parallel bus interface for general purpose I/O.

Another popular monitor program for this system is called MIKBUG.

== See also ==
- Microprocessor development boards
- For a clone of the D2 kit see following website (6802 MAXC D2 Board).

== Bibliography ==
- Leventhal, Lance A. Microcomputer experimentation with the Motorola MEK6800D2. Prentice-Hall, ISBN 0-13-580761-1
