= ACFA-8 =

Microcomputer

- Developer: Andrew M. Veronis
- Manufacturer: ACFA, Inc.
- Type: Microcomputer; Single-board computer
- CPU: Motorola 6808
- Memory: Up to 64 KB

The ACFA-8 (Affordable Computers for All-8) was a microcomputer based on the Motorola 6808. It was released in 1979 by Andrew M. Veronis, a doctorate of computer science more well-known for his books on computer engineering.

== Description and history ==
The ACFA-8 was a single-board microcomputer running the Motorola 6808. The board's memory layout comprised an array of eight-chip sockets, onto which 3 KB or 6 KB DRAM chips can be populated, for a maximum of 48 KB of RAM. As stock it came with 16 KB of RAM. The computer's cassette interface supports the Kansas City standard, and the computer came shipped with 8-KB BASIC on cassette. The board features a built-in color RF modulator; American buyers got shipped a color video display for the price of the computer. Both American and overseas buyers however both got the board with an enclosure, a keyboard, and the power supply unit.

The ACFA-8 was one of the few microcomputers based on the 6808 microprocessor, being a lesser-cost component in the Motorola 6800 family. It was more popular with embedded processing systems in industrial environments. The computer came shipped with manuals describing the principles of operation, which Electronics Today International described as "really a computer course on their own". ACFA, Inc. (Affordable Computers for All), was founded by Andrew M. Veronis, a doctorate of computer science more well-known for his books on computer engineering. In the United States, the computer sold for $695 as an assembled kit or $595 unassembled. Computer journalist Fred Ruckdeschel felt that it needed an additional $300 in hardware on top of the cost of the unassembled kit to bring it on par with its contemporaries. To that end the ACFA-8 came with a RS-232C serial port for peripherals including teletypes.

ACFA, Inc. was incorporated at 130 Main Street in Annapolis, Maryland. This location was previously the home of Wicker Basket Ltd., a seller of wicker furniture, cookware, and fine china. Veronis bought that company in 1977 and was the proprietor of the store for a few years. Veronis forfeit ACFA shortly after its incorporation. He continued working in the computer industry in the following decades while also teaching computer science at the University of Maryland, College Park.
