= Motorola 6800 =

8-bit microprocessor

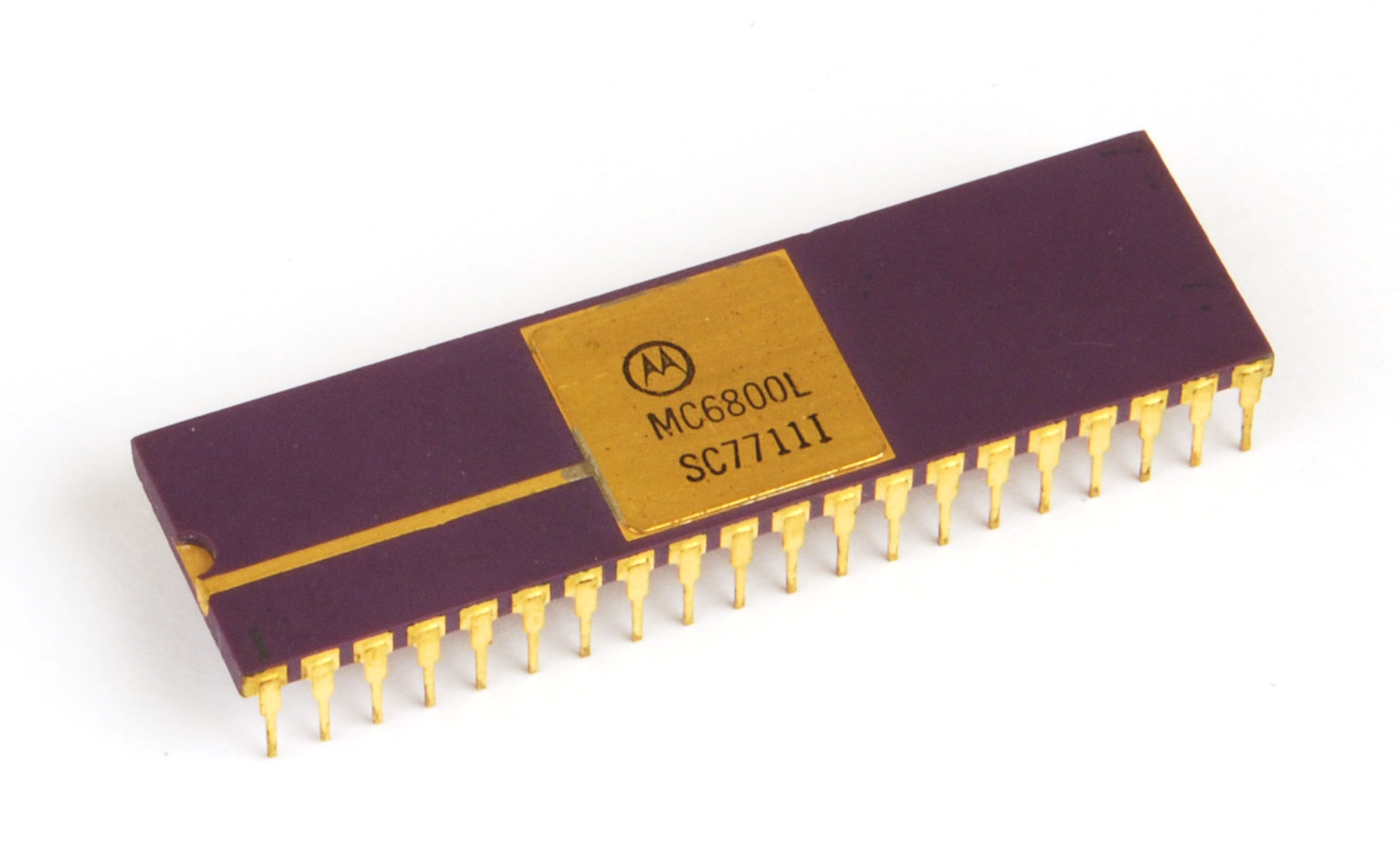
- Motorola MC6800 microprocessor

General information
- Launched: March 1974; 52 years ago
- Common manufacturer: Motorola

Performance
- Max. CPU clock rate: 1 MHz to 2 MHz
- Data width: 8 bits
- Address width: 16 bits

Physical specifications
- Transistors: 4,100
- Package: 40-pin DIP

Architecture and classification
- Instruction set: 6800
- Number of instructions: 72

History
- Successors: Motorola 6809; Motorola 68000; MOS 6502

The 6800 ("sixty-eight hundred") is an 8-bit microprocessor designed and first manufactured by Motorola in 1974. The MC6800 microprocessor was part of the M6800 Microcomputer System (later dubbed 68xx) that also included serial and parallel interface ICs, RAM, ROM and other support chips. A significant design feature was that the M6800 family of ICs required only a single five-volt power supply at a time when most other microprocessors required three voltages. The M6800 Microcomputer System was announced in March 1974 and was in full production by the end of that year. American Microsystems was licensed as the second source.

The 6800 has a 16-bit address bus that can directly access 64 KB of memory and an 8-bit bi-directional data bus. It has 72 instructions with seven addressing modes for a total of 197 opcodes. The original MC6800 could have a clock frequency of up to 1 MHz. Later versions had a maximum clock frequency of 2 MHz.

In addition to the ICs, Motorola also provided a complete assembly language development system. The customer could use the software on a remote timeshare computer or on an in-house minicomputer system. The Motorola EXORciser was a desktop computer built with the M6800 ICs that could be used for prototyping and debugging new designs. An expansive documentation package included datasheets on all ICs, two assembly language programming manuals, and a 700-page application manual that showed how to design a point-of-sale terminal (a computerized cash register) around the 6800.

The 6800 was popular in computer peripherals, test equipment applications and point-of-sale terminals. It has also been used in arcade games and pinball machines. The MC6802, introduced in 1977, included 128 bytes of RAM and an internal clock oscillator on chip. The MC6801 and MC6805 included RAM, ROM and I/O on a single chip and were popular in automotive applications. Some MC6805 models integrated a Serial Peripheral Interface (SPI). The Motorola 6809 was an updated compatible design.

== History ==
=== Motorola's history in semiconductors ===
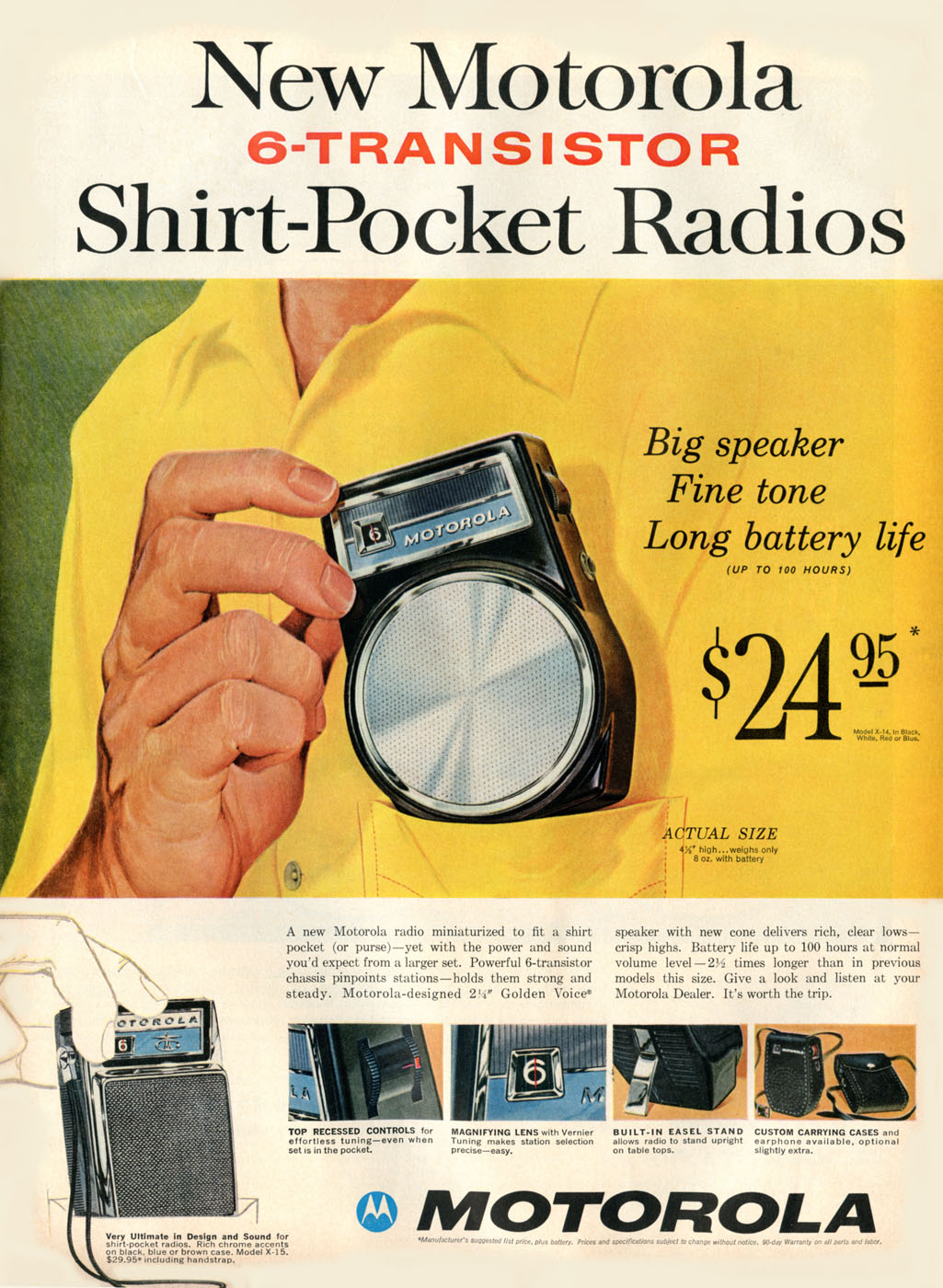
Motorola began making semiconductors in the 1950s.

Galvin Manufacturing Corporation was founded in 1928; the company name was changed to Motorola in 1947. They began commercial production of transistors at a new US$1.5 million facility in Phoenix, Arizona in 1955.

By the mid-1960s, Motorola had expanded their semiconductor division under the direction of Lester Hogan. Motorola's transistors and integrated circuits were used in-house for their communication, military, automotive and consumer products and they were also sold to other companies. In 1968, Robert Noyce left Fairchild Semiconductor to found Intel, and Fairchild responded by hiring Hogan as the new CEO. Eight other Motorola employees moved with him, they became known as "Hogan's heroes". The resulting chaos was nevertheless short lived, and the company continued to grow through this period.

By 1973 the Semiconductor Products Division (SPD) had sales of $419 million and was the second largest semiconductor company after Texas Instruments.

=== 5065 ===
By the early 1970s it was clear that most of the large companies in the semiconductor space, including Fairchild and the still-new Intel, were planning to introduce microprocessors. Intel began shopping around the initial concept of what would become the Intel 4004, and on their sales trips they visited Victor Comptometer in Chicago looking for potential customers. Victor had introduced the world's first electronic calculator that used integrated circuits, the Victor 3900. There, Tom Bennett saw the design.

In 1971, Motorola decided to enter the calculator business. Looking for someone to lead the effort, they hired Bennett away from Victor. Shortly after joining, Olivetti visited Motorola with a outline of a design for a microprocessor they were planning to use in a series of programmable calculators. Motorola agreed to complete the design and produce it on their PMOS lines in Phoenix.

While the design was eventually completed successfully, their fab proved unable to produce the chips. The problems with the line had become obvious with a number of similar failures; it also proved unable to make competitive memory devices and other designs. To save the contract, Motorola licensed the design to their competitor, Mostek, with the requirement that Mostek could only sell outside the calculator market. Mostek then put the design on the market as the Mostek 5065.

=== Development team ===
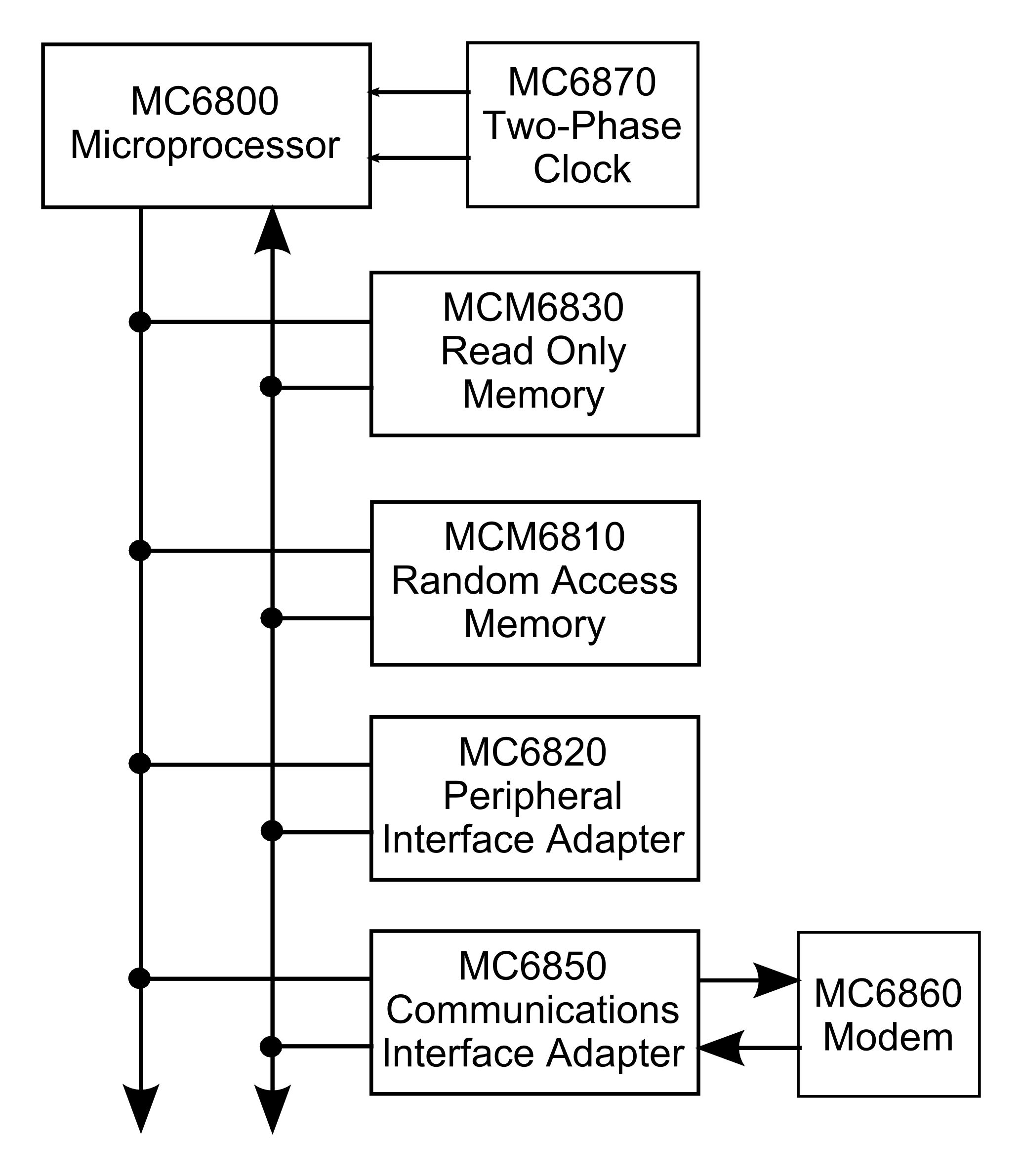
Block diagram of a M6800 microcomputer system

Customers continued to approach the company with new ideas, and it became increasingly obvious that these concepts could be implemented using a single flexible microprocessor design. A new effort began in late 1971, but in early 1972, the marketing department returned a report stating they could only sell 18,000 over a five year period. Unconvinced, Bennett hired Link Young to try again. Young returned with a potential order for 200,000 from National Data Corporation, more than enough to start design work.

The team was composed of designer Tom Bennett, engineering director Jeff LaVell, product marketer Link Young and systems designers Mike Wiles, Gene Schriber and Doug Powell. They were all located in Mesa, Arizona, in greater Phoenix. By the time the project was finished, Bennett had 17 chip designers and layout people working on five chips. LaVell had 15 to 20 system engineers and there was another applications engineering group of similar size.

Tom Bennett had a background in industrial controls and had worked for Victor Comptometer in the 1960s designing the first electronic calculator to use MOS ICs, the Victor 3900. In May 1969 Ted Hoff showed Bennett early diagrams of the Intel 4004 to see if it would meet their calculator needs. Bennett joined Motorola in 1971 to design calculator ICs. He was soon assigned as the chief architect of the microprocessor project that produced the 6800. Others have taken credit for designing the 6800. In September 1975 Robert H. Cushman, EDN magazine's microprocessor editor, interviewed Chuck Peddle about MOS Technology's new 6502 microprocessor. Cushman then asked "Tom Bennett, master architect of the 6800", to comment about this new competitor. After the 6800 project Bennett worked on automotive applications and Motorola became a major supplier of microprocessors used in automobiles.

Jeff LaVell joined Motorola in 1966 and worked in the computer industry marketing organization. LaVell had previously worked for Collins Radio on their C8500 computer that was built with small scale ECL ICs. In 1971, he led a group that examined the needs of their existing customers such as Hewlett-Packard, National Cash Register, Control Data Corporation (CDC), and Digital Equipment Corporation (DEC). They would study the customer's products and try to identify functions that could be implemented in larger integrated circuits at a lower cost. The result of the survey was a family of 15 building blocks; each could be implemented in an integrated circuit. Some of these blocks were implemented in the initial M6800 release and more were added over the next few years. To evaluate the 6800 architecture while the chip was being designed, LaVell's team built an equivalent circuit using 451 small scale TTL ICs on five 10 by 10 inch (25 by 25 cm) circuit boards. Later they reduced this to 114 ICs on one board by using ROMs and MSI (medium scale integration) logic devices.

Motorola 6800 DIP chip pinout

John Buchanan was a memory designer at Motorola when Bennett asked him to design a voltage doubler for the 6800. Typical n-channel MOS IC's required three power supplies: −5 volts, +5 volts and +12 volts. The M6800 family was to use only one, +5 volts. It was easy to eliminate the −5 volt supply by using an internal voltage inverter, but the enhancement-mode logic also needed a supply of 10 to 12 volts. To address this, the design added an on-chip voltage doubler. Buchanan did the circuit design, analysis and layout for the 6800 microprocessor. He received patents on the voltage doubler and the 6800 chip layout. Rod Orgill assisted Buchanan with analyses and 6800 chip layout. Later Orgill would design the MOS Technology 6501 microprocessor that was socket compatible with the 6800.

Bill Lattin joined Motorola in 1969 and his group provided the computer simulation tools for characterizing the new MOS circuits in the 6800. Lattin and Frank Jenkins had both attended UC Berkeley and studied computer circuit simulators under Donald Pederson, the designer of the SPICE circuit simulator. Motorola's simulator, MTIME, was an advanced version of the TIME circuit simulator that Jenkins had developed at Berkeley. The group published a technical paper, "MOS-device modeling for computer implementation" in 1973 describing a "5-V single-supply n-channel technology" operating at 1 MHz. They could simulate a 50 MOSFET circuit on an IBM 370/165 mainframe computer. In November 1975, Lattin joined Intel to work on their next generation microprocessor.

Bill Mensch joined Motorola in 1971 after graduating from the University of Arizona. He had worked several years as an electronics technician before earning his BSEE degree. The first year at Motorola was a series of three-month rotations through four different areas. Mensch did a flowchart for a modem that would become the 6860. He also worked the application group that was defining the M6800 system. After this training year, he was assigned to the 6820 Peripheral Interface Adapter (PIA) development team. Mensch was a major contributor to the design of this chip and received a patent on the IC layout and was named as a co-inventor of seven other M6800 system patents. Later Mensch would design the MOS Technology 6502 microprocessor.

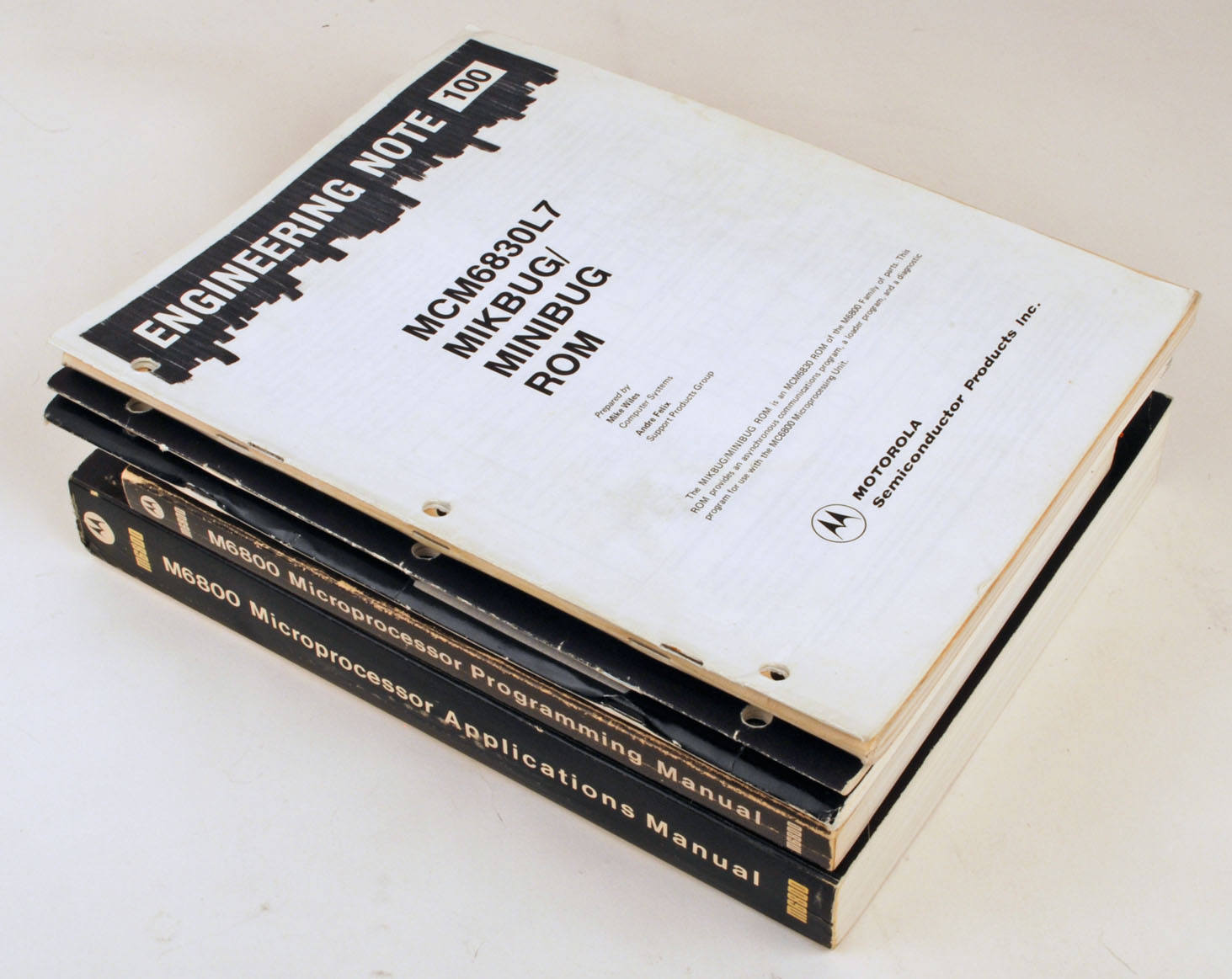
MIKBUG was part of the extensive M6800 microcomputer support developed by Motorola's Application Engineering Group.

Mike Wiles was a design engineer in Jeff LaVell's group and made numerous customer visits with Tom Bennett during 6800 product definition phase. He is listed as an inventor on eighteen 6800 patents but is best known for a computer program, MIKBUG. This was a monitor for a 6800 computer system that allowed the user to examine the contents of RAM and to save or load programs to tape. This 512 byte program occupied half of an MCM6830 ROM. This ROM was used in the Motorola MEK6800 design evaluation kit and early hobby computer kits. Wiles stayed with Motorola, moved to Austin and helped design the MC6801 microcontroller that was released in 1978.

Chuck Peddle joined the design team in 1973 after the 6800 processor design was done but he contributed to overall system design and to several peripheral chips, particularly the 6820 (PIA) parallel interface. Peddle is listed as an inventor on sixteen Motorola patents, most have six or more co-inventors. Like the other engineers on the team, Peddle visited potential customers and solicited their feedback. Peddle and John Buchanan built one of the earliest 6800 demonstration boards. In August 1974, Chuck Peddle left Motorola and joined a small semiconductor company in Pennsylvania, MOS Technology. There he led the team that designed the 6500 microprocessor family.

=== MC6800 microprocessor design ===
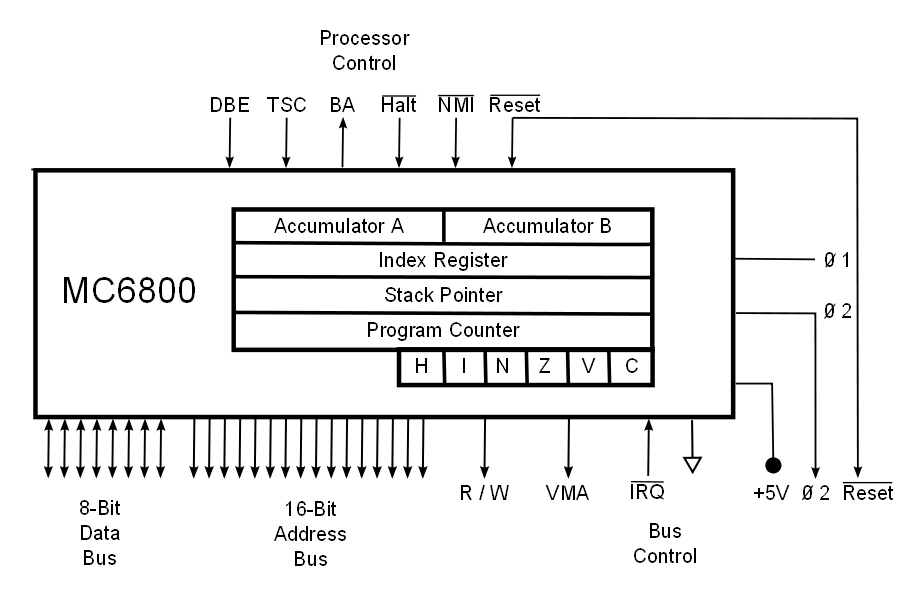
A Motorola MC6800 microprocessor registers and I/O lines

Motorola 6800 registers
^{1}_{5}	^{1}_{4}	^{1}_{3}	^{1}_{2}	^{1}_{1}	^{1}_{0}	^{0}_{9}	^{0}_{8}	^{0}_{7}	^{0}_{6}	^{0}_{5}	^{0}_{4}	^{0}_{3}	^{0}_{2}	^{0}_{1}	^{0}_{0}	(bit position)
Main registers
								ACCA								A accumulator
								ACCB								B accumulator
Index registers
IX																Index register
SP																Stack Pointer
Program counter
PC																Program Counter
Condition Codes
								1	1	H	I	N	Z	V	C	CC

The Motorola 6800 and the Intel 8080 were designed at the same time and were similar in function. The 8080 was an extension and enhancement of the Intel 8008, which in turn was an LSI implementation of the TTL-based CPU design used in the Datapoint 2200. The 6800 architecture was a TTL-compatible LSI design modeled after the DEC PDP-11 processor.

The 6800 had an 8-bit bidirectional data bus, a 16-bit address bus that could address 64 KB of memory, and came in a 40-pin DIP package. The 6800 had two 8-bit accumulators, a 16-bit index register, and a 16-bit stack pointer. The direct addressing mode, often known as the zero page in other processors, allowed fast access to the first 256 bytes of memory. I/O devices were addressed as memory so there were no special I/O instructions. When the 6800 was reset, it loaded the program counter from the highest address and started execution at the memory location stored there.

The 6800 had a three-state control that would disable the address bus to allow another device direct memory access. For instance, a floppy disk controller could load data into memory without requiring any support from the CPU. It was even possible to have two 6800 processors access the same memory. However, in practice systems of such complexity usually required the use of external bus transceivers to drive the system bus; in such circuits, the on-processor bus control was disabled entirely in favor of using the similar capabilities of the bus transceiver. In contrast, the 6802 dispensed with this on-chip control entirely in order to free up pins for other functions in the same 40-pin package as the 6800, but this functionality could still be achieved using an external bus transceiver.

MOS ICs typically used dual clock signals (a two-phase clock) in the 1970s. These were generated externally for the 6800, The 6800 had a minimum clock rate of 100 kHz, and initially ran at a maximum rate of 1 MHz. Higher-speed versions of the 6800 were released in 1976.

Other divisions in Motorola developed components for the M6800 family. The Components Products Department designed the MC6870 two-phase clock IC, and the Memory Products group provided a full line of ROMs and RAMs. The CMOS group's MC14411 Bit Rate Generator provided a 75 to 9600 baud clock for the MC6850 serial interface. The buffers for address and data buses were standard Motorola products. Motorola could supply every IC, transistor, and diode necessary to build an MC6800-based computer.

=== MOS ICs ===
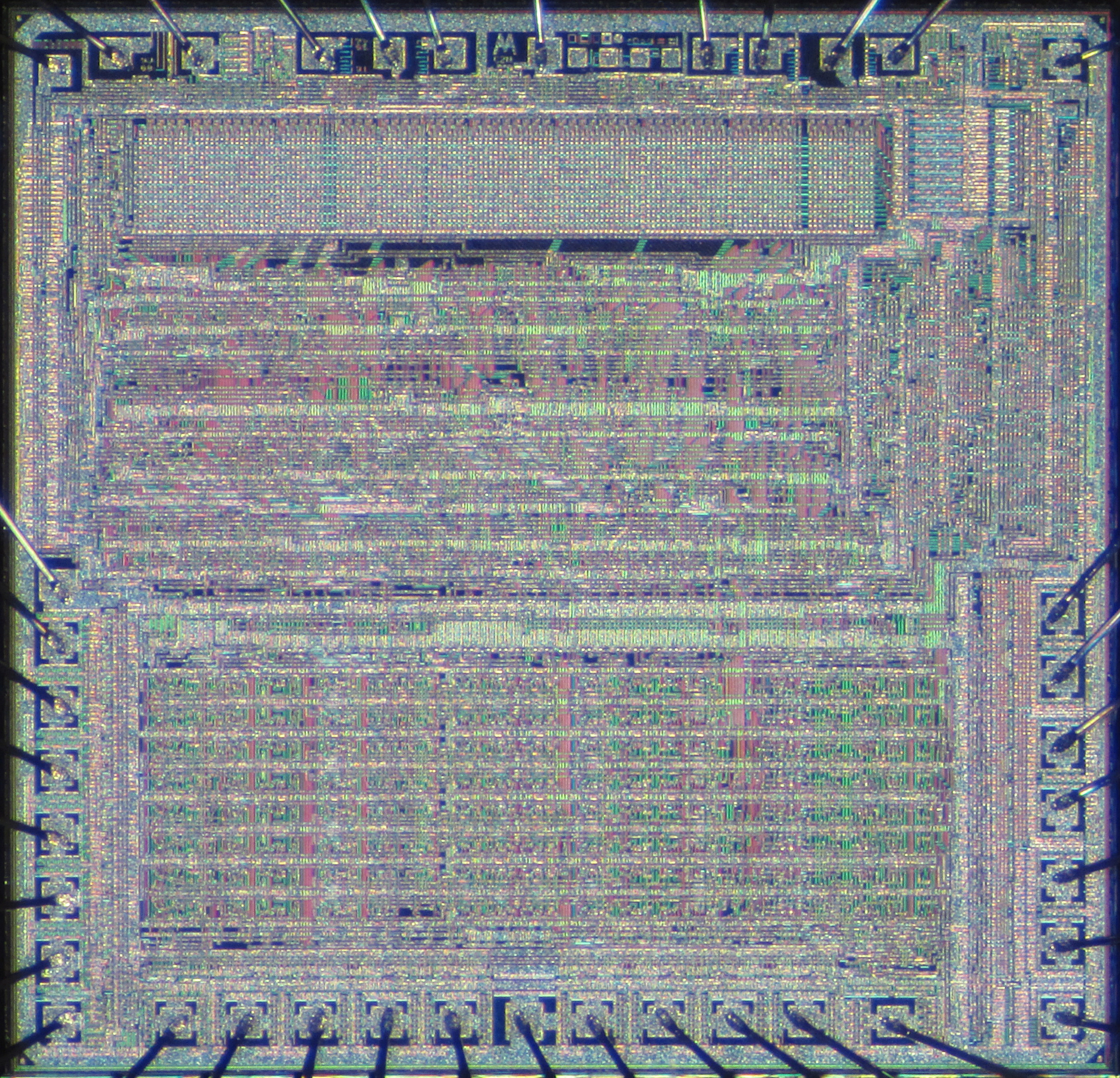
Die shot of Motorola MC6800L

The first-generation metal–oxide–semiconductor (MOS) chips used p-channel field-effect transistors, known as p-channel MOSFETs (p-channel describes the configuration of the transistor). These ICs were used in calculators and in the first microprocessor, the Intel 4004. They were easy to produce but were slow and difficult to interface to the popular TTL digital logic ICs. An n-channel MOS integrated circuit could operate two or three times faster and was compatible with TTL. They were much more difficult to produce because of an increased sensitivity to contamination that required an ultra clean production line and meticulous process control. Motorola did not have an n-channel MOS production capability and had to develop one for the 6800 family.

Motorola's n-channel MOS test integrated circuits were complete in late 1971 and these indicated the clock rate would be limited to 1 MHz. These used "enhancement-mode" MOS transistors. There was a newer fabrication technology that used "depletion-mode" MOS transistors as loads, which would allow smaller and faster circuits (this was also known as depletion-load nMOS). The "depletion-mode" processing required extra steps so Motorola decided to stay with "enhancement-mode" for the new single-supply-voltage design. The 1 MHz clock rate meant the chip designers would have to come up with several architectural innovations to speed up the microprocessor throughput. These resulting circuits were faster but required more area on the chip.

In the 1970s, semiconductors were fabricated on 3 inch (75 mm) diameter silicon wafers. Each wafer could produce 100 to 200 integrated circuit chips or dies. The technical literature would state the length and width of each chip in "mils" (0.001 inch). The current industry practice is to state the chip area. Processing wafers required multiple steps and flaws would appear at various locations on the wafer during each step. The larger the chip the more likely it would encounter a defect. The percentage of working chips, or yield, declined steeply for chips larger than 160 mils (4 mm) on a side.

The target size for the 6800 was 180 mils (4.6 mm) on each side but the final size was 212 mils (5.4 mm) with an area of 29.0 mm^{2}. At 180 mils, a 3-inch (76 mm) wafer will hold about 190 chips, 212 mils reduces that to 140 chips. At this size the yield may be 20% or 28 chips per wafer. The Motorola 1975 annual report highlights the new MC6800 microprocessor but has several paragraphs on the "MOS yield problems."

The yield problem was solved with a design revision started in 1975 to use depletion mode in the M6800 family devices. The 6800 die size was reduced to 160 mils (4 mm) per side with an area of 16.5 mm^{2}. This also allowed faster clock speeds, the MC68A00 would operate at 1.5 MHz and the MC68B00 at 2.0 MHz. The new parts were available in July 1976.

=== M6800 family introduction ===
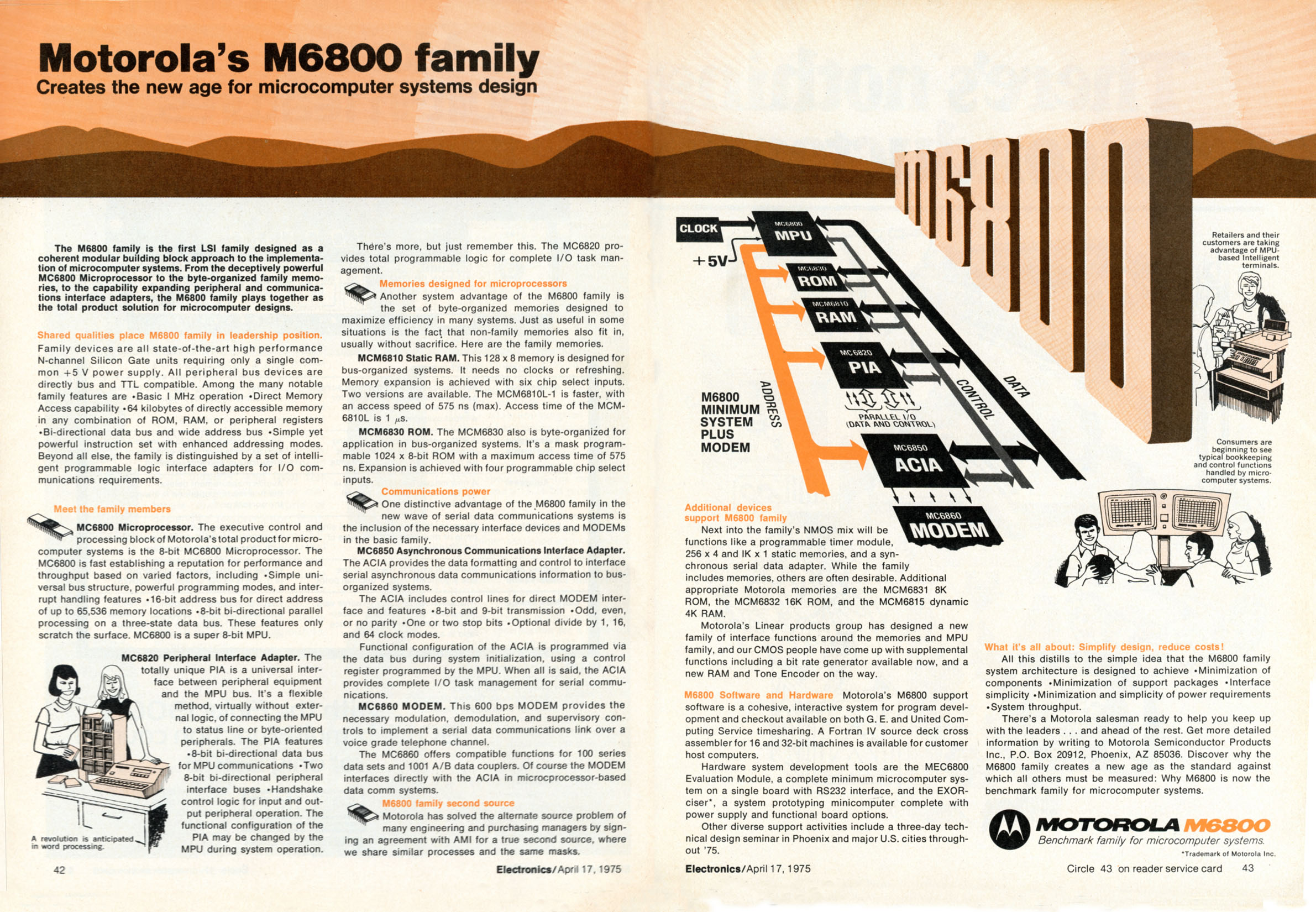
An early advertisement for the Motorola's M6800 family microcomputer system

The March 7, 1974 issue of Electronics had a two-page story on the Motorola MC6800 microprocessor along with the MC6820 Peripheral Interface Adapter, the MC6850 Asynchronous Communications Interface Adapter, the MCM6810 128 byte RAM and the MCM6830 1024 byte ROM. This was followed by an eight-page article in the April 18, 1974 issue, written by the Motorola design team. This issue also had an article introducing the Intel 8080.

Both the Intel 8080 and the Motorola MC6800 processors began layout around December 1972. The first working 8080 chips were produced January 1974 and the first public announcement was in February 1974. The 8080 used same three voltage N-channel MOS process as Intel's existing memory chips allowing full production to begin that April.

The first working MC6800 chips were produced in February 1974 and engineering samples were given to select customers. Hewlett-Packard in Loveland, Colorado wanted the MC6800 for a new desktop calculator and had a prototype system working by June. The MC6800 used a new single-voltage N-channel MOS process that proved to be very difficult to implement. The M6800 microcomputer system was finally in production by November 1974. Motorola matched Intel's price for single microprocessor, $360. (The IBM System/360 was a well-known computer at this time.) In April 1975 the MEK6800D1 microcomputer design kit was offered for $300. The kit included all six chips in the M6800 family plus application and programming manuals. The price of a single MC6800 microprocessor was $175.

Link Young was the product marketer that developed the total system approach for the M6800 family release. In addition to releasing a full set of support chips with the 6800 microprocessor, Motorola offered a software and hardware development system. The software development tools were available on remote time-sharing computers or the source code was available so the customer could use an in-house computer system. The software that would run on a microprocessor system was typically written in assembly language. The development system consisted of a text editor, assembler and a simulator. This allowed the developer to test the software before the target system was complete. The hardware development was a desktop computer built with M6800 family CPU and peripherals known as the EXORcisor. Motorola offered a three- to five-day microprocessor design course for the 6800 hardware and software. This systems-oriented approach became the standard way new microprocessor were introduced.

=== Design team breakup ===
The principal design effort on the M6800 family was complete in mid-1974, and many engineers left the group or the company. Several factors led to the break-up of the design group.

Motorola had opened a new MOS semiconductor facility in Austin, Texas. The entire engineering team was scheduled to relocate there in 1975. Many of the employees liked living in the Phoenix suburb of Mesa and were very wary about moving to Austin. The team leaders were unsuccessful with their pleas to senior management on deferring the move.

A recession hit the semiconductor industry in mid-1974 resulting in thousands of layoffs. A November 1974 issue of Electronics magazine reports that Motorola had laid off 4,500 employees, Texas Instruments 7,000 and Signetics 4,000. Motorola's Semiconductor Products Division would lose thirty million dollars in the next 12 months and there were rumors that the IC group would be sold off. Motorola did not sell the division but they did change the management and organization. By the end of 1974 Intel fired almost a third of its 3,500 employees. The MOS IC business rebounded but job security was not taken for granted in 1974 and 1975.

Chuck Peddle (and other Motorola engineers) had been visiting customers to explain the benefits of microprocessors. Both Intel and Motorola had initially set the price of a single microprocessor at $360. Many customers were hesitant to adopt this new microprocessor technology with such a high price tag. (The actual price for production quantities was much lower.) In mid-1974 Peddle proposed a simplified microprocessor that could be sold at a much lower price. Motorola's "total product family" strategy did not focus on the price of MPU but on reducing the customer's total design cost. Peddle's concept was repeatedly rejected, and eventually management told him to stop talking about it. He wrote a memo stating that these instructions were a clear statement that Motorola was abandoning the concept, meaning they could not claim intellectual property against it.

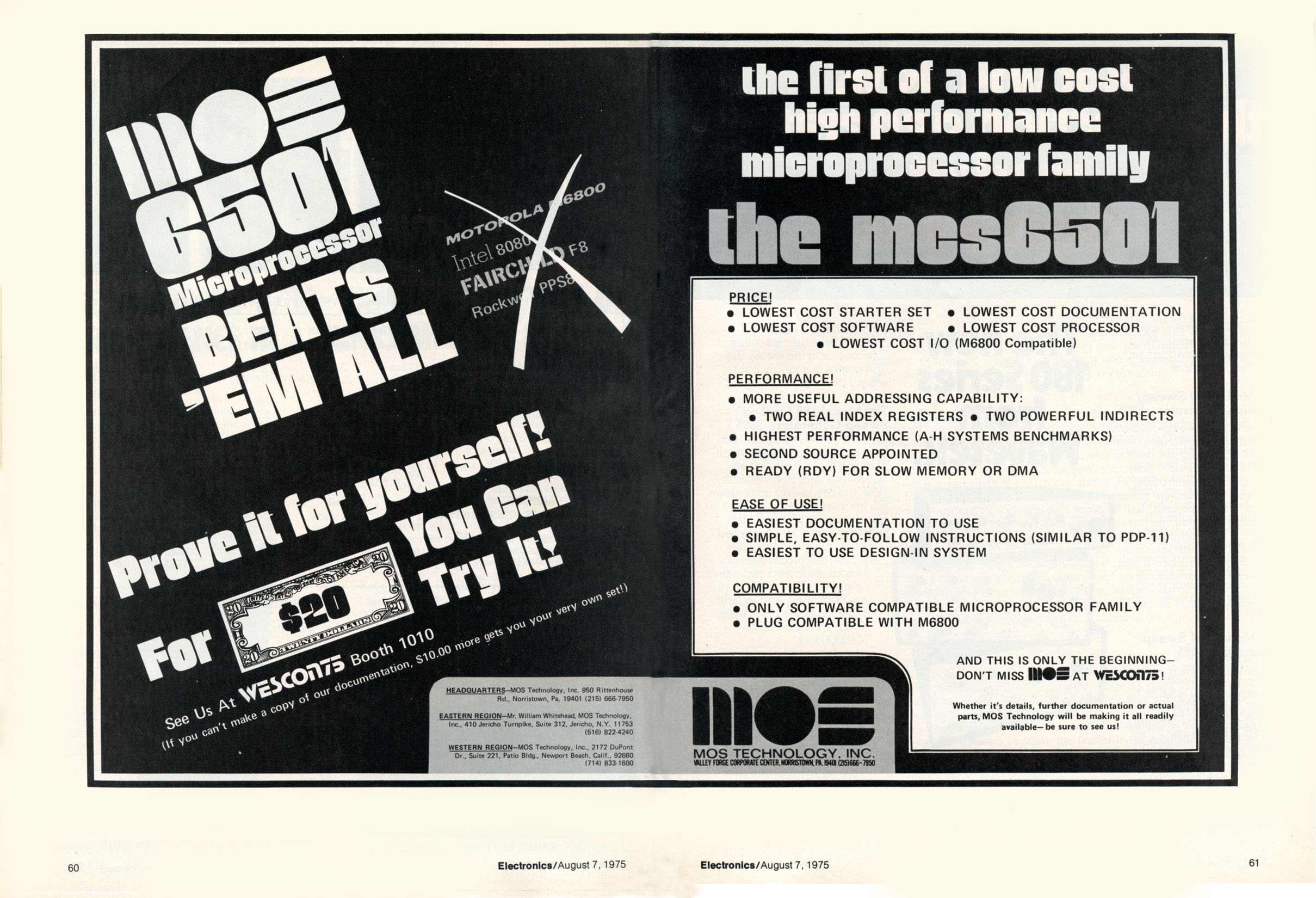
Introductory advertisement for the MOS Technology MCS6501 microprocessor in August 1975

Peddle continued working for Motorola while looking for investors for his new microprocessor concept. After approaching Mostek and being rejected, in August 1974 Chuck Peddle left Motorola and joined a small semiconductor company in Pennsylvania, MOS Technology. He was followed by seven other Motorola engineers: Harry Bawcom, Ray Hirt, Terry Holdt, Mike James, Will Mathis, Bill Mensch and Rod Orgill. Peddle's group at MOS Technology developed two new microprocessors that were compatible with the Motorola peripheral chips like the 6820 PIA. Rod Orgill designed the MCS6501 processor that would plug into a MC6800 socket and Bill Mensch did the MCS6502 that had the clock generation circuit on chip. These microprocessors would not run 6800 programs because they had a different architecture and instruction set. The major goal was a microprocessor that would sell for under $25. This would be done by removing non-essential features to reduce the chip size. An 8-bit stack pointer was used instead of a 16-bit one. The second accumulator was omitted. The address buffers did not have a three-state mode for Direct Memory Access (DMA) data transfers. The goal was to get the chip size down to 153 mils x 168 mils (3.9 mm × 4.3 mm).

Peddle was a very effective spokesman and the MOS Technology microprocessors were extensively covered in the trade press. One of the earliest was a full-page story on the MCS6501 and MCS6502 microprocessors in the July 24, 1975 issue of Electronics magazine. Stories also ran in EE Times (August 24, 1975), EDN (September 20, 1975), Electronic News (November 3, 1975) and Byte (November 1975). Advertisements for the 6501 appeared in several publications the first week of August 1975. The 6501 would be for sale at the WESCON trade show in San Francisco, September 16–19, 1975, for $20 each. In September 1975 the advertisements included both the 6501 and the 6502 microprocessors. The 6502 would only cost $25.

Motorola responded to MOS Technology's $20 microprocessor by immediately reducing the single-unit price of the 6800 microprocessor from $175 to $69 and then suing MOS Technology in November 1975. Motorola claimed that the eight former Motorola engineers used technical information developed at Motorola in the design of the 6501 and 6502 microprocessors. MOS Technology's other business, calculator chips, was declining due to a price war with Texas Instruments so their financial backer, Allen-Bradley, decided to limit the possible losses and sold the assets of MOS Technology back to the founders. The lawsuit was settled in April 1976 with MOS Technology dropping the 6501 chip that would plug into a Motorola 6800 socket and licensing Motorola's peripheral chips. Motorola reduced the single-unit price of the 6800 to $35.

The MOS Technology vs. Motorola lawsuit has developed a David and Goliath narrative over the years. One point was that Motorola did not have patents on the technology. This was technically true when the lawsuit was filed in late 1975 On October 30, 1974, before the 6800 was released, Motorola filed numerous patents applications on the microprocessor family, and over twenty patents were subsequently granted. The first was to Tom Bennett on June 8, 1976, for the 6800 internal address bus. The second was to Bill Mensch on July 6, 1976, for the 6820 chip layout. Many of these patents named several of the departing engineers as co-inventors. These patents covered the 6800 bus and how the peripheral chips interfaced with the microprocessor.

=== Move to Austin ===
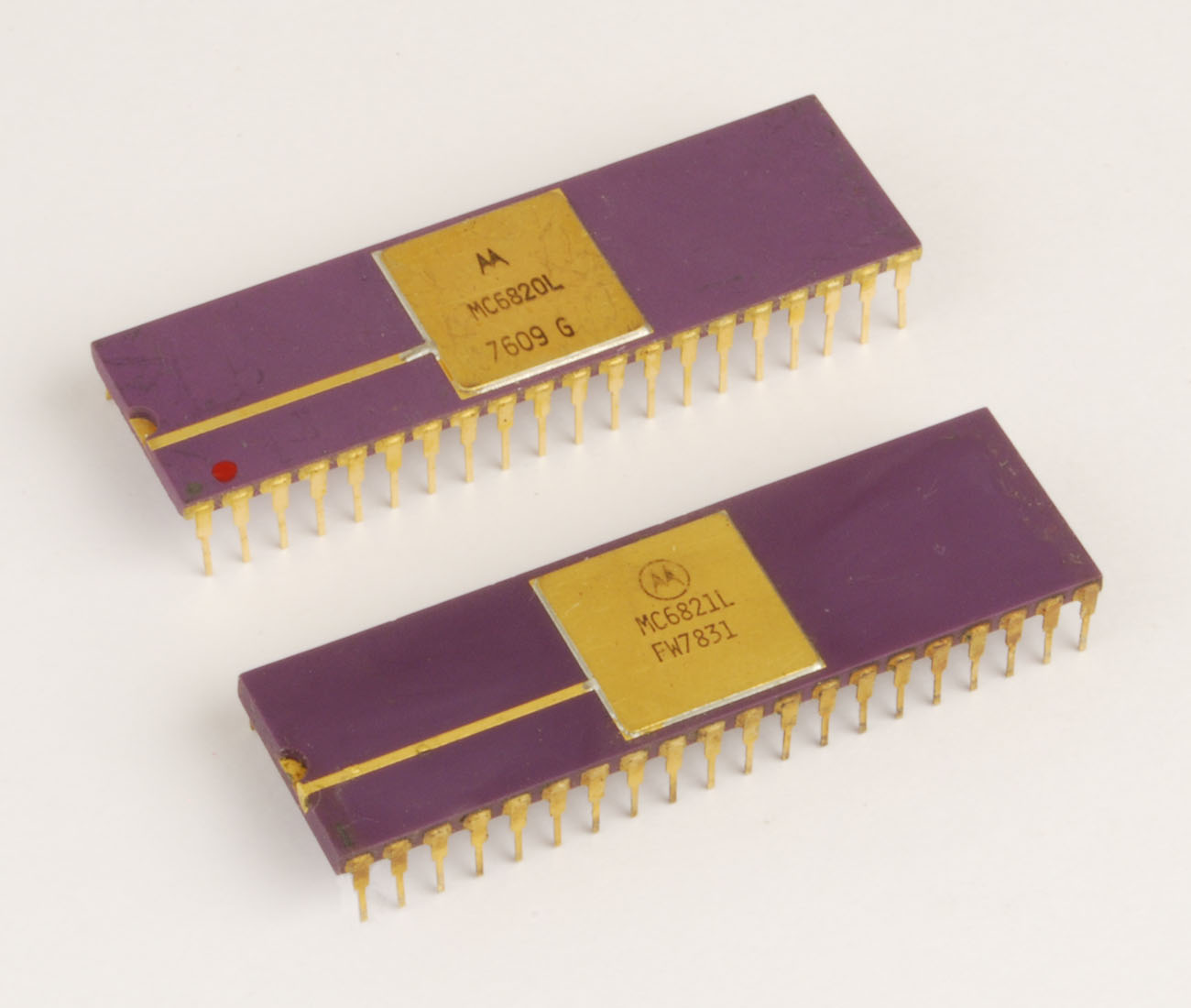
The M6800 family chips were redesigned to use depletion-mode technology. The MC6820 PIA became the MC6821.

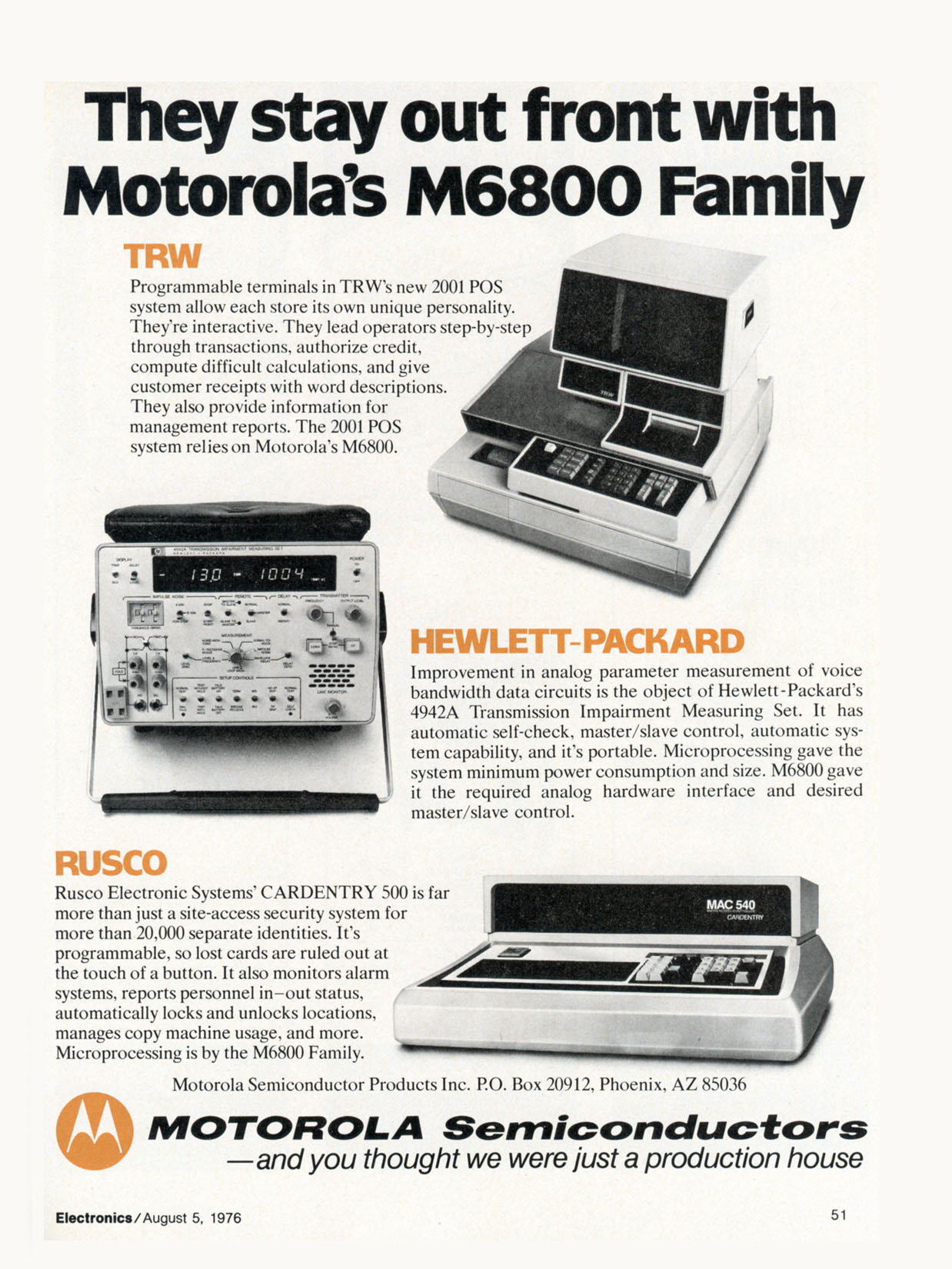
Three typical applications for the MC6800, as shown in a Motorola advertisement from August 1976: a point-of-sale terminal, an electronic signal tester, and a security card entry system.

Gary Daniels was designing ICs for electronic wristwatches when Motorola shut down their Timepiece Electronics Unit. Tom Bennett offered him a job in the microprocessor group in November 1974. Bennett did not want to leave the Phoenix area so Gary Daniels managed the microprocessor development in Austin. (Daniels was the microprocessor design manager for the next ten years before he was promoted to a vice president.)

The first task was to redesign the 6800 MPU to improve the manufacturing yield and to operate at a faster clock. This design used depletion-mode technology and was known internally as the MC6800D. The transistor count went from 4000 to 5000 but the die area was reduced from 29.0 mm^{2} to 16.5 mm^{2} (allowing the price of the CPU to be lowered to $35). The maximum clock rate for selected parts doubled to 2 MHz. The other chips in the M6800 family were also redesigned to use depletion-mode technology. The Peripheral Interface Adapter had a slight change in the electrical characteristics of the I/O pins so the MC6820 became the MC6821. These new IC were completed in July 1976.

A new low-cost clock generator chip, the MC6875, was released in 1977. It replaced the $35 MC6870 hybrid IC. The MC6875 came in a 16-pin dip package and could use quartz crystal or a resistor capacitor network.

Another project was incorporating 128 bytes of RAM and the clock generator on a single 11,000-transistor chip. The MC6802 microprocessor was released in March 1977. The companion MC6846 chip had 2048 byte ROM, an 8-bit bidirectional port and a programmable timer. This was a two-chip microcomputer. The 6802 has an on-chip oscillator that uses an external 4 MHz quartz crystal to produce the two-phase 1 MHz clock. The internal 128 byte RAM could be disabled by grounding a pin and devices with defective RAM were sold as a MC6808. The 6808 was rarely used as the main microprocessor on general-purpose computers, being more popular in embedded systems (the 1979 ACFA-8 microcomputer proved an exception).

A series of peripheral chip were introduced by 1978. The MC6840 programmable counter had three 16-bit binary counters that could be used for frequency measurement, event counting, or interval measurement. The MC6844 Direct Memory Access Controller could transfer data from an I/O controller to RAM without loading down the MC6800 microprocessor. The MC6845 CRT Controller (CRTC) provided the control logic for a character based computer terminal. The 6845 had support for a light pen, an alternative to a computer mouse.

The MC6845 was a very popular chip: it was even used in the original IBM Monochrome Display Adapter and the original IBM Color Graphics Adapter for the IBM PC and successors, where the 6845 was used with an Intel 8088 CPU. During the time of cold war technology embargoes, a 6845 clone named CM607 was produced in Bulgaria. The later IBM Enhanced Graphics Adapter (EGA) card contained a custom IBM chip (the EGA CRTC) that replaced the Motorola 6845, adding many enhancements, in a mostly-compatible way. The IBM Video Graphics Array (VGA), which became ubiquitous (to the point that it is still emulated as the baseline functionality of most modern PC video adapter chips) incorporates a compatible near-superset of the EGA CRTC, still mostly-compatible with the MC6845 (but by this point without the light pen support, which the EGA CRTC retained).

The MC6801 was a single-chip microcomputer (that today would also be called a microcontroller) incorporating a 6802 CPU with 128 bytes of RAM, a 2 KB ROM, a 16-bit timer, 31 programmable parallel I/O lines, and a serial port. (The MC6803 was the same except without the ROM and with fewer different bus configurations.) It could also use the I/O lines as data and address buses to connect to standard M6800 peripherals. The 6801 would execute 6800 code, but it had ten additional instructions, and the execution time of key instructions was reduced. The two 8-bit accumulators could act as a single 16-bit accumulator for double precision addition, subtraction and multiplication. It was initially designed for automotive use, with General Motors as the lead customer. The first application was a trip computer for the 1978 Cadillac Seville. This 35,000 transistor chip was too expensive for wide-scale adoption in automobiles, so a reduced function MC6805 single-chip microcomputer was designed.

The MC6801 was one of the first microprocessors with a multiply instruction.

The Hitachi HD6303 (not to be confused with the Hitachi 6309) is a second-source reimplementation of the Motorola MC6803, with a few additional instructions, and a slightly faster implementation of the 8x8 multiply instruction. The Hitachi HD6303 is used in the first PDA, the 1984 Psion Organiser. The Hitachi HD6303 was also used in the 1983 "Pocket Telex".

The Motorola MC6803 was also used in the TRS-80 MC-10 and the closely related Matra Alice.

The MC6809 was the most advanced 8-bit microprocessor Motorola produced. It had a new instruction set that was similar to the 6800 but abandoned op-code compatibility for improved performance and high-level language support; the 6809 and 6800 were software compatible in that assemblers could (and generally did) generate code which was equivalent to 6800 opcodes that the 6809 did not directly emulate. In that sense, the 6809 was upward compatible with the 6800. The 6809 had two 16-bit index registers, two 16-bit stack pointers, and many instructions to perform 16-bit operations, including the first 8-bit multiply instruction (generating a 16-bit product) in a microprocessor. Other key points of the 6809 design were full support for both position-independent code (object code that can run wherever it is loaded in memory) and reentrant code (object code that can be re-invoked when interrupted or by calling itself recursively), features previously seen only in much larger machines such as IBM 360 mainframes.

== Use in personal computers ==
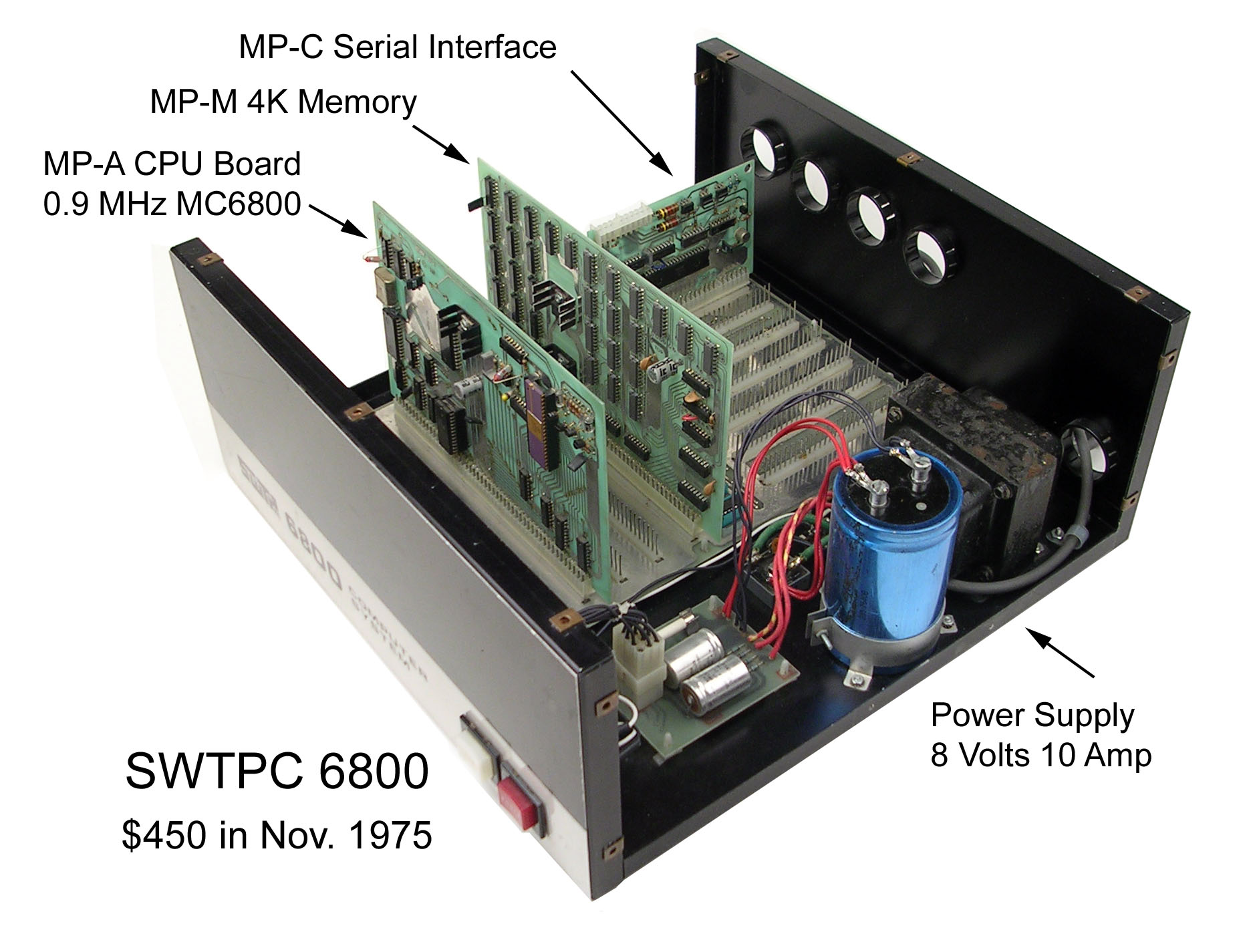
The SWTPC 6800 computer system, introduced in November 1975, was based on the MEK6800 design evaluation kit chip set.

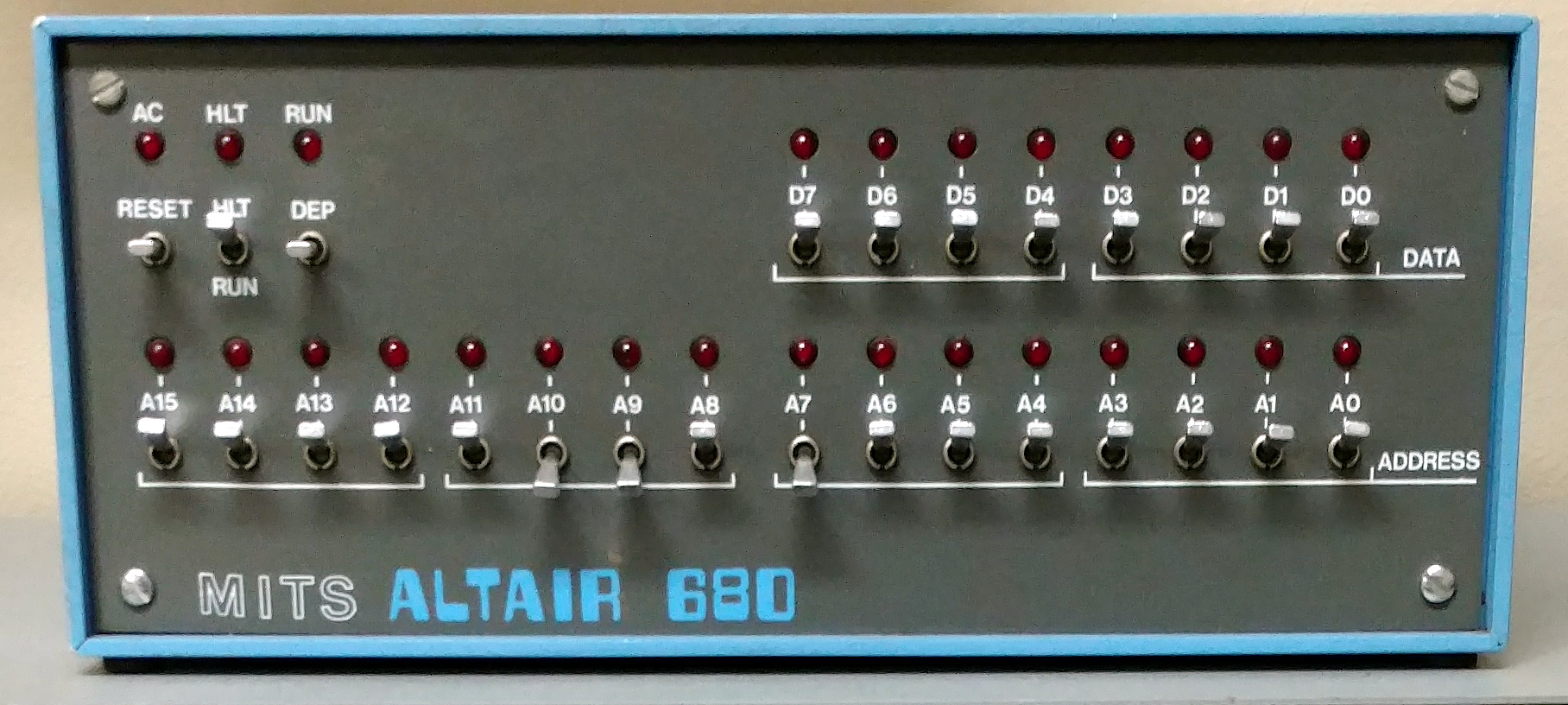
MITS Altair 680

The MITS Altair 8800, the first successful personal computer, used the Intel 8080 microprocessor and was featured on the January 1975 cover of Popular Electronics. The first personal computers using the Motorola 6800 were introduced in late 1975. Sphere Corporation of Bountiful, Utah ran a quarter-page advertisement in the July 1975 issue of Radio-Electronics for a $650 USD computer kit with a 6800 microprocessor, 4 kilobytes of RAM, a video board and a keyboard. This would display 16 lines of 32 characters on a TV or monitor. The Sphere computer kits began shipping in November 1975.

Southwest Technical Products Corporation of San Antonio, Texas, officially announced their SWTPC 6800 Computer System in November 1975. Wayne Green visited SWTPC in August 1975 and described the SWTPC computer kit complete with photos of a working system in the October 1975 issue of 73. The SWTPC 6800 was based on the Motorola MEK6800 design evaluation kit chip set and used the MIKBUG ROM Software.

The MITS Altair 680 was on the cover of the November 1975 issue of Popular Electronics. The Altair 680 used a 6800 microprocessor and, unlike the SWTPC machine, also had a front panel with toggle switches and LEDs. The initial design had to be revised and first deliveries of the Altair 680B were in April 1976.

Sphere was a small startup company and had difficulties delivering all of the products they announced. They filed for a Chapter 11 bankruptcy in April 1977. The Altair 680B was popular but MITS focused most of the resources on their Altair 8800 computer system and they exited the hobby market in 1978. The Southwest Technical Products computer was the most successful 6800 based personal computer. Other companies, for instance, Smoke Signal Broadcasting (California), Gimix (Chicago), Midwest Scientific (Olathe, Kansas), and Helix Systems (Hazelwood, Missouri), started producing SWTPC 6800 bus compatible boards and complete systems. Technical Systems Consultants of West Lafayette, Indiana, supplied tape based software for the 6800 (and later 6809) based computers and, after disk systems became available, operating systems and disk software as well. The 8080 systems were far more popular than the 6800 ones.

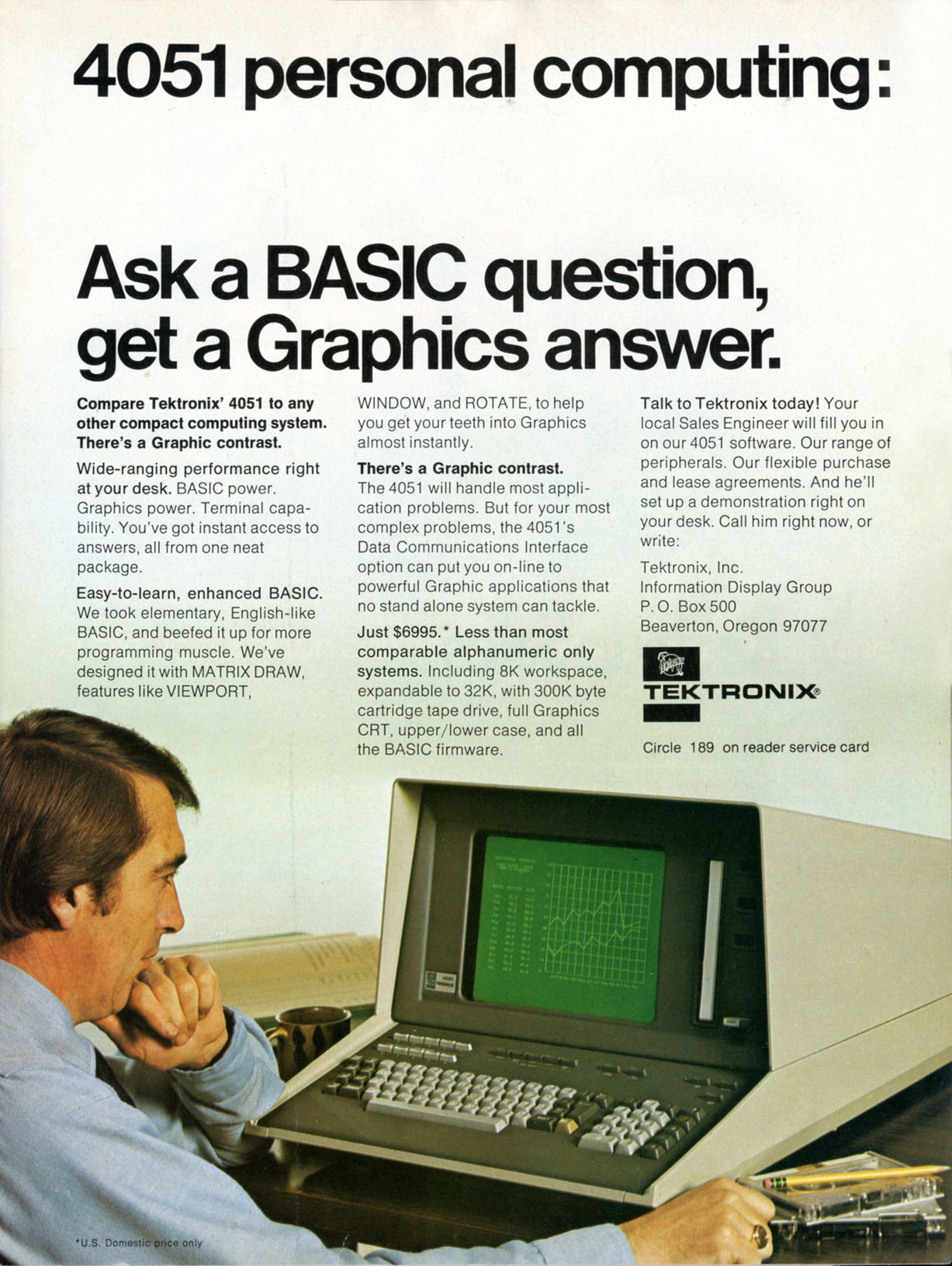
The Tektronix 4051 graphics computing system used a 6800 microprocessor.

The Tektronix 4051 Graphics Computing System was introduced in October 1975. This was a professional desktop computer that had a 6800 microprocessor with up to 32 KB of user RAM, 300 KB magnetic tape storage, BASIC in ROM and a 1024 by 780 graphics display. The Tektronix 4051 sold for $7000 (equivalent to $41,900 in 2025), rather higher than the personal computers using the 6800.

The 6800 processor was also used in the APF MP1000 game console. The Matsushita JR series used a Panasonic MN1800A NMOS microprocessor, compatible with the MC6802.

HP introduced the 9815A desktop calculator based on the 6800 in 1975. All HP's other machines at the time used their own processor designs. It was fitted with 16k of ROM and 2k of RAM with optional IO expansion and RAM expansion to 4k. A later 9815S included both options as standard.

The architecture and instruction set of the 6800 were easy for beginners to understand and Heathkit developed a microprocessor course and the ET3400 6800 trainer. The course and trainer proved popular with individuals and schools.

Motorola's next generation 8-bit microprocessor architecture, the MC6809 (1979), was not binary code compatible with the 6800, but nearly all assembly code would assemble and run on the 6809; 6800 family peripheral chips worked as a matter of course.

== Instruction set ==
Each instruction consists of one to three bytes. The first byte is the opcode and the subsequent one or two bytes are optional parameters. Although most operations are 8-bit, the 6800 includes some 16-bit compares, increments, decrements, loads, and stores. Instructions execute in 2 to 12 clock (machine) cycles with most instructions taking no more than 5 cycles. ALU1, ALU2, n, and P opcode fields are documented in next table.

Motorola 6800 instruction set
Opcode								Operands		Mnemonic	Description
7	6	5	4	3	2	1	0	b2	b3	Mnemonic	Description
0	0	0	0	0	0	0	1	—	—	NOP	No operation
0	0	0	0	0	1	1	0	—	—	TAP	CC ← ACCA
0	0	0	0	0	1	1	1	—	—	TPA	ACCA ← CC
0	0	0	0	1	0	0	0	—	—	INX	IX ← IX + 1
0	0	0	0	1	0	0	1	—	—	DCX	IX ← IX - 1
0	0	0	0	1	0	1	f	—	—	CLV SEV	V ← f
0	0	0	0	1	1	0	f	—	—	CLC SEC	C ← f
0	0	0	0	1	1	1	f	—	—	CLI SEI	I ← f
0	0	0	1	0	0	0	0	—	—	SBA	ACCA ← ACCA - ACCB
0	0	0	1	0	0	0	1	—	—	CBA	ACCA - ACCB
0	0	0	1	0	1	1	0	—	—	TAB	ACCB ← ACCA
0	0	0	1	0	1	1	1	—	—	TBA	ACCA ← ACCB
0	0	0	1	1	0	0	1	—	—	DAA	ACCA ← ACCA + bcd.correction
0	0	0	1	1	0	1	1	—	—	ABA	ACCA ← ACCA + ACCB
0	0	1	0	0	0	0	0	disp	—	BRA	PC ← PC + disp + 2
0	0	1	0	COND				disp	—	BHI BLS BCC BCS BNE BEQ BVC BVS BPL BMI BGE BLT BLE	if COND = true, PC ← PC + disp + 2
0	0	1	1	0	0	0	0	—	—	TSX	IX ← SP + 1
0	0	1	1	0	0	0	1	—	—	INS	SP ← SP + 1
0	0	1	1	0	0	1	n	—	—	PUL ACCn	SP ← SP + 1; ACCn ← (SP)
0	0	1	1	0	1	0	0	—	—	DES	SP ← SP - 1
0	0	1	1	0	1	0	1	—	—	TXS	SP ← IX - 1
0	0	1	1	0	1	1	n	—	—	PSH ACCn	(SP) ← ACCn; SP ← SP - 1
0	0	1	1	1	0	0	1	—	—	RTS (Return from subroutine)	SP ← SP + 1; PCH ← (SP); SP ← SP + 1; PCL ← (SP)
0	0	1	1	1	0	1	1	—	—	RTI (Return from interrupt)	SP ← SP + 1; CC ← (SP); SP ← SP + 1; ACCB ← (SP); SP ← SP + 1; ACCA ← (SP); SP ← SP + 1; IXH ← (SP); SP ← SP + 1; IXL ← (SP); SP ← SP + 1; PCH ← (SP); SP ← SP + 1; PCL ← (SP)
0	0	1	1	1	1	1	0	—	—	WAI (Wait for interrupt)	PC ← PC + 1; (SP) ← PCL; SP ← SP - 1; (SP) ← PCH; SP ← SP - 1; (SP) ← IXL; SP ← SP - 1; (SP) ← IXH; SP ← SP - 1; (SP) ← ACCA; SP ← SP - 1; (SP) ← ACCB; SP ← SP - 1; (SP) ← CC; SP ← SP - 1; stop
0	0	1	1	1	1	1	1	—	—	SWI (Software interrupt)	PC ← PC + 1; (SP) ← PCL; SP ← SP - 1; (SP) ← PCH; SP ← SP - 1; (SP) ← IXL; SP ← SP - 1; (SP) ← IXH; SP ← SP - 1; (SP) ← ACCA; SP ← SP - 1; (SP) ← ACCB; SP ← SP - 1; (SP) ← CC; SP ← SP - 1; I ← 1; PC ← (0xFFFA)
0	1	0	n	ALU1				—	—	NEG COM LSR ROR ASR ASL ROL DEC INC TST CLR: ACCn	ACCn ← [ALU1 operation] ACCn
0	1	1	0	ALU1				ind	—	NEG COM LSR ROR ASR ASL ROL DEC INC TST CLR: ind,X	(ind + IX) ← [ALU1 operation] (ind + IX)
0	1	1	0	1	1	1	0	ind	—	JMP ind,X	PC ← ind + IX
0	1	1	1	ALU1				addhi	addlo	NEG COM LSR ROR ASR ASL ROL DEC INC TST CLR: ext	(add) ← [ALU1 operation] (add)
0	1	1	1	1	1	1	0	addhi	addlo	JMP ext	PC ← add
1	n	0	0	ALU2				imm	—	CMP SUB SBC AND BIT LDA EOR ADC ORA ADD #imm	ACCn ← ACCn [ALU2 operation] imm
1	0	0	0	1	1	0	0	imhi	imlo	CPX #imm	IX - imm (16-bit)
1	0	0	0	1	1	0	1	disp	—	BSR rel	PC ← PC + 2; (SP) ← PCL; SP ← SP - 1; (SP) ← PCH; SP ← SP - 1; PC ← PC + disp + 2
1	P	0	0	1	1	1	0	imhi	imlo	LDS LDX #imm	P ← imm (16-bit)
1	n	0	1	ALU2				addlo	—	CMP SUB SBC AND BIT LDA EOR ADC ORA ADD dir	ACCn ← ACCn [ALU2 operation] (0x0000 + addlo)
1	0	0	1	1	1	0	0	addlo	—	CPX dir	IX - (0x0000 + addlo) (16-bit)
1	P	0	1	1	1	1	0	addlo	—	LDS LDX dir	P ← (0x0000 + addlo) (16-bit)
1	P	0	1	1	1	1	1	addlo	—	STS STX dir	(0x0000 + addlo) ← P (16-bit)
1	n	1	0	ALU2				ind	—	CMP SUB SBC AND BIT LDA EOR ADC ORA ADD ind,X	ACCn ← ACCn [ALU2 operation] (ind + IX)
1	0	1	0	1	1	0	0	ind	—	CPX ind,X	IX - (ind + IX) (16-bit)
1	0	1	0	1	1	0	1	ind	—	JSR ind,X	PC ← PC + 2; (SP) ← PCL; SP ← SP - 1; (SP) ← PCH; SP ← SP - 1; PC ← ind + IX
1	P	1	0	1	1	1	0	ind	—	LDS LDX ind,X	P ← (ind + IX) (16-bit)
1	P	1	0	1	1	1	1	ind	—	STS STX ind,X	(ind + IX) ← P (16-bit)
1	n	1	1	ALU2				addhi	addlo	CMP SUB SBC AND BIT LDA EOR ADC ORA ADD ext	ACCn ← ACCn [ALU2 operation] (add)
1	0	1	1	1	1	0	0	addhi	addlo	CPX ext	IX - (add) (16-bit)
1	0	1	1	1	1	0	1	addhi	addlo	JSR ext	PC ← PC + 3; (SP) ← PCL; SP ← SP - 1; (SP) ← PCH; SP ← SP - 1; PC ← add
1	P	1	1	1	1	1	0	addhi	addlo	LDS LDX ext	P ← (add) (16-bit)
1	P	1	1	1	1	1	1	addhi	addlo	STS STX ext	(add) ← P (16-bit)
7	6	5	4	3	2	1	0	b2	b3	Mnemonic	Description
n				3	2	1	0	P	ALU2		ALU1
ACCA				0	0	0	0	SP	SUB (ACCn ← ACCn - arg)		NEG (arg ← 0 - arg)
ACCB				0	0	0	1	IX	CMP (ACCn - arg)		
				0	0	1	0		SBC (ACCn ← ACCn - arg - C)		
				0	0	1	1				COM (arg ← ¬arg)
				0	1	0	0		AND (ACCn ← ACCn ∧ arg)		LSR (C ← arg_{0}; arg_{0-6} ← arg_{1-7}; arg_{7} ← 0)
				0	1	0	1		BIT (ACCn ∧ arg)		
				0	1	1	0		LDA (ACCn ← arg)		ROR (C ← arg_{0}; arg_{0-6} ← arg_{1-7}; arg_{7} ← C)
				0	1	1	1				ASR (C ← arg_{0}; arg_{0-6} ← arg_{1-7})
				1	0	0	0		EOR (ACCn ← ACCn ⊻ arg)		ASL (C ← arg_{7}; arg_{1-7} ← arg_{0-6}; arg_{0} ← 0)
				1	0	0	1		ADC (ACCn ← ACCn + arg + C)		ROL (C ← arg_{7}; arg_{1-7} ← arg_{0-6}; arg_{0} ← C)
				1	0	1	0		ORA (ACCn ← ACCn ∨ arg)		DEC (arg ← arg - 1)
				1	0	1	1		ADD (ACCn ← ACCn + arg)		
				1	1	0	0				INC (arg ← arg + 1)
				1	1	0	1				TST (arg - 0)
				1	1	1	1				CLR (arg ← 0)
				3	2	1	0	ALU2			ALU1

=== Example code ===
The following 6800 assembly language source code is for a subroutine named memcpy that copies a block of data bytes of a given size from one location to another. The data block is copied one byte at a time, from lowest address to highest.

; memcpy --
; Copy a block of memory from one location to another.
; Called as a subroutine, note return to saved PC addr on exit
; Entry parameters
;      cnt - Number of bytes to copy
;      src - Address of source data block
;      dst - Address of target data block

cnt         dw      $0000       ; Count
src         dw      $0000       ; Source addr
dst         dw      $0000       ; Desination addr

memcpy      public
            lda b   cnt+1       ;Set B = cnt.L
            beq     check       ;If cnt.L=0, goto check
loop        ldx     src         ;Set IX = src
            lda a   0,x         ;Load A from (src)
            inx                 ;Set src = src+1
            stx     src
            ldx     dst         ;Set IX = dst
            sta a   0,x         ;Store A to (dst)
            inx                 ;Set dst = dst+1
            stx     dst
            dec     b           ;Decr B
            bne     loop        ;Repeat the loop
check       tst     cnt+0       ;If cnt.H=0,
            beq     done        ;Then quit
            dec     cnt+0       ;Decr cnt.H
            ; loop back and do 256*(cnt.H+1) more copies (B=0) 
            bra     loop        ;Repeat the loop
done        rts                 ;Return

== Peripherals ==
List from "Motorola Microcomputer Components", November 1978. Memory-mapped I/O is used, and I/O ports are mapped to part of the main memory address space.

Part	Description	Image
MCM6810	128 byte static RAM	Brochure
MC6820	Peripheral Interface Adapter (PIA)	Brochure
MC6821	Peripheral Interface Adapter (PIA)	Brochure
MC6828	Priority Interrupt Controller (PIC)	Brochure
MC6829	Memory Management Unit (MMU)	
MCM6830	1024 byte ROM	Brochure
MC6840	Programmable Timer Module (PTM)	Brochure
MC6843	Floppy Disk Controller (FDC)	Brochure
MC6844	Direct Memory Access Controller (DMAC)	Brochure
MC6845	CRT Controller (CRTC)	Brochure
MC6846	ROM-I/O-Timer	Brochure
MC6847	Video Display Generator (VDG)	
MC68488	General Purpose Interface Adapter (GPIB) IEEE488	Brochure
MC6850	Asynchronous Communication Interface Adapter (ACIA)	Brochure
MC6852	Synchronous Serial Data Adapter (SDAA)	Brochure
MC6854	Advanced Data Link Controller (ADLC)	Brochure
MC6859	Data Security Device (DSD)	
MC6860	0–600 bit/s Digital Modem	Brochure
MC6862	2400 bit/s Modulator	Brochure
MC6870	Two-Phase Microprocessor Clock	Advertisement
MC6875	Clock Generator	Brochure
MC6883	Synchronous Address Multiplexer (SAM)	

== Second sources ==
A common requirement for manufacturing companies was to require two or more sources for every part in the products they made. This ensured they could get parts if a supplier had financial problems or a disaster. Initially Motorola selected American Microsystems Inc (AMI) as a second source for the M6800 family. Hitachi, Fujitsu, Fairchild, Rockwell and Thomson Semiconductors were added later.

Rochester Electronics was authorized by Freescale/Motorola in 2014 to continue manufacturing any of the 8-bit peripherals and 8-bit processors of this era. Rochester specializes in fully authorized device duplication. Freescale has provided all the source design archives to enable Rochester Electronics for this product and others. At the end of 2016, Rochester was fully qualified and shipping the MC6802 processor, the MC6840 PTM, and the MC6809 processor (including the MC68A09, and MC68B09 versions) and can still be bought today.

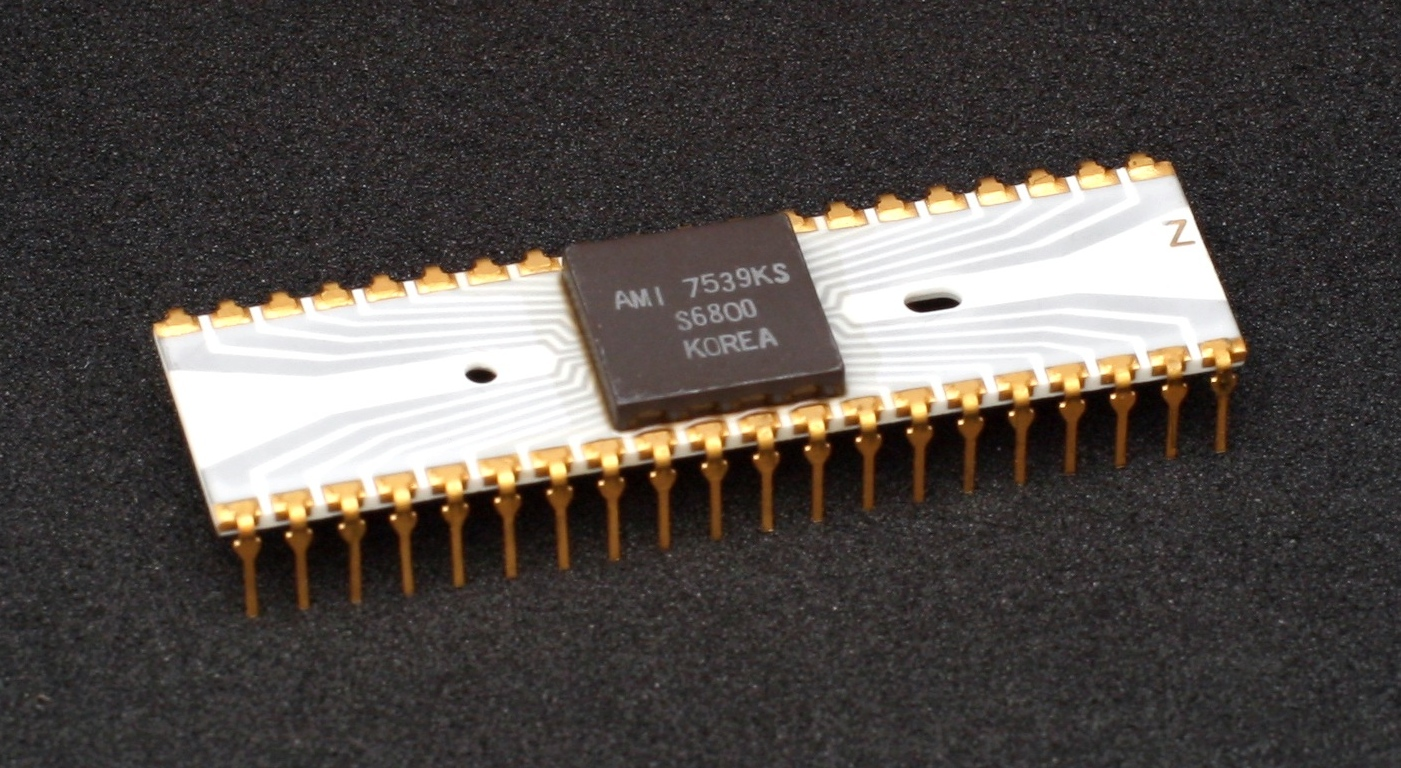
AMI S6800 MPU

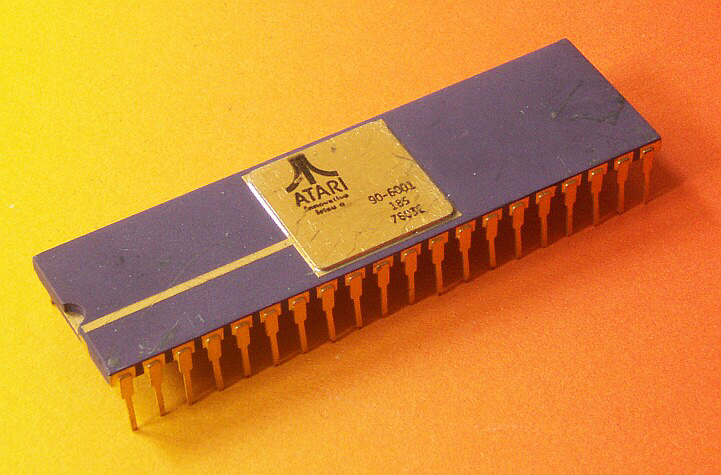
Atari 90-6001

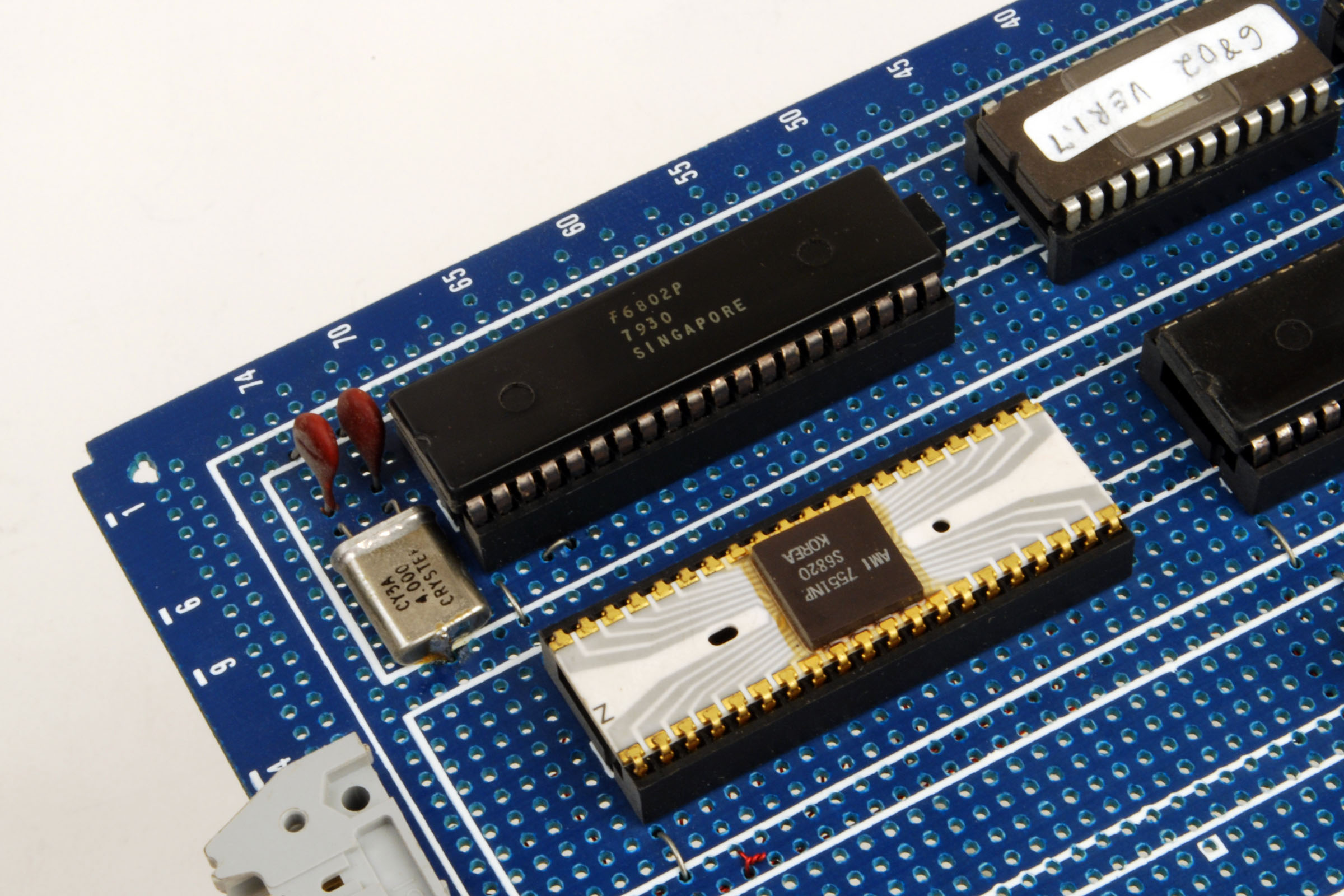
Fairchild F6802P and an AMI S6820 PIA

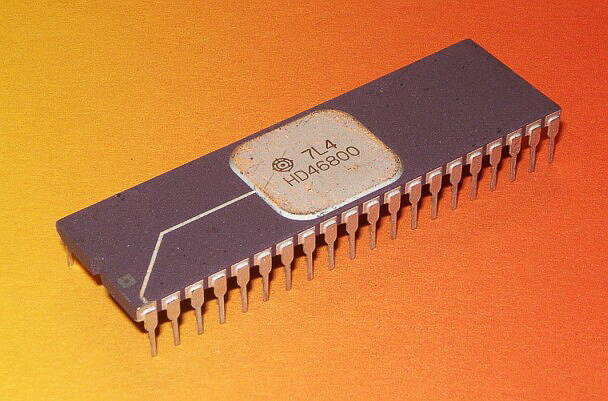
Hitachi HD46800

== Oral histories ==
- "Intel 8080 Microprocessor Oral History Panel" Steve Bisset, Federico Faggin, Hal Feeney, Edward Gelbach, Ted Hoff, Stan Mazor, Masatoshi Shima, Computer History Museum, April 26, 2007, moderator: David House.
- "Zilog Z80 Microprocessor Oral History Panel" Federico Faggin, Masatoshi Shima, Ralph Ungermann. Computer History Museum, April 27, 2007, moderator: Michael Slater.
- "Motorola 6800 oral history panel: development and promotion" Thomas H. Bennett, John Ekiss, William (Bill) Lattin, Jeff Lavell. Computer History Museum, March 28, 2008, moderator: David Laws.
- Interview with William Mensch Stanford and the Silicon Valley Project, October 9, 1995. Transcript

== See also ==
- EXORmacs, a follow-up system for M68000 processors
- Motorola 68000 16/32-bit successor
- MEK6800D2 a development kit for the 6800
