= Intel system development kit =

Development kit

Each time Intel launched a new microprocessor, they simultaneously provided a system development kit (SDK) allowing engineers, university students, and others to familiarise themselves with the new processor's concepts and features. The SDK single-board computers allowed the user to enter object code from a keyboard or upload it through a communication port, and then test run the code. The SDK boards provided a system monitor ROM to operate the keyboard and other interfaces. Kits varied in their specific features but generally offered optional memory and interface configurations, a serial terminal link, audio cassette storage, and EPROM program memory. Intel's Intellec development system could download code to the SDK boards.

In addition, Intel sold a range of larger-scale development systems which ran their proprietary operating systems and hosted development tools – assemblers and later compilers – targeting their processors. These included the Microcomputer Development System (MDS), Personal Development System (PDS), In-Circuit Emulators (ICE), device programmers and so on. Most of these were rendered obsolete when the IBM PC became a de facto standard, and by other standardised technologies such as JTAG.

== SIM4-01 ==
The SIM4-01 prototyping board holds a complete MCS-4 micro computer set including the first microprocessor, the Intel 4004, introduced in 1971.

== SIM8-01 ==
The SIM8-01 prototyping board based on the Intel 8008 was released in 1972.

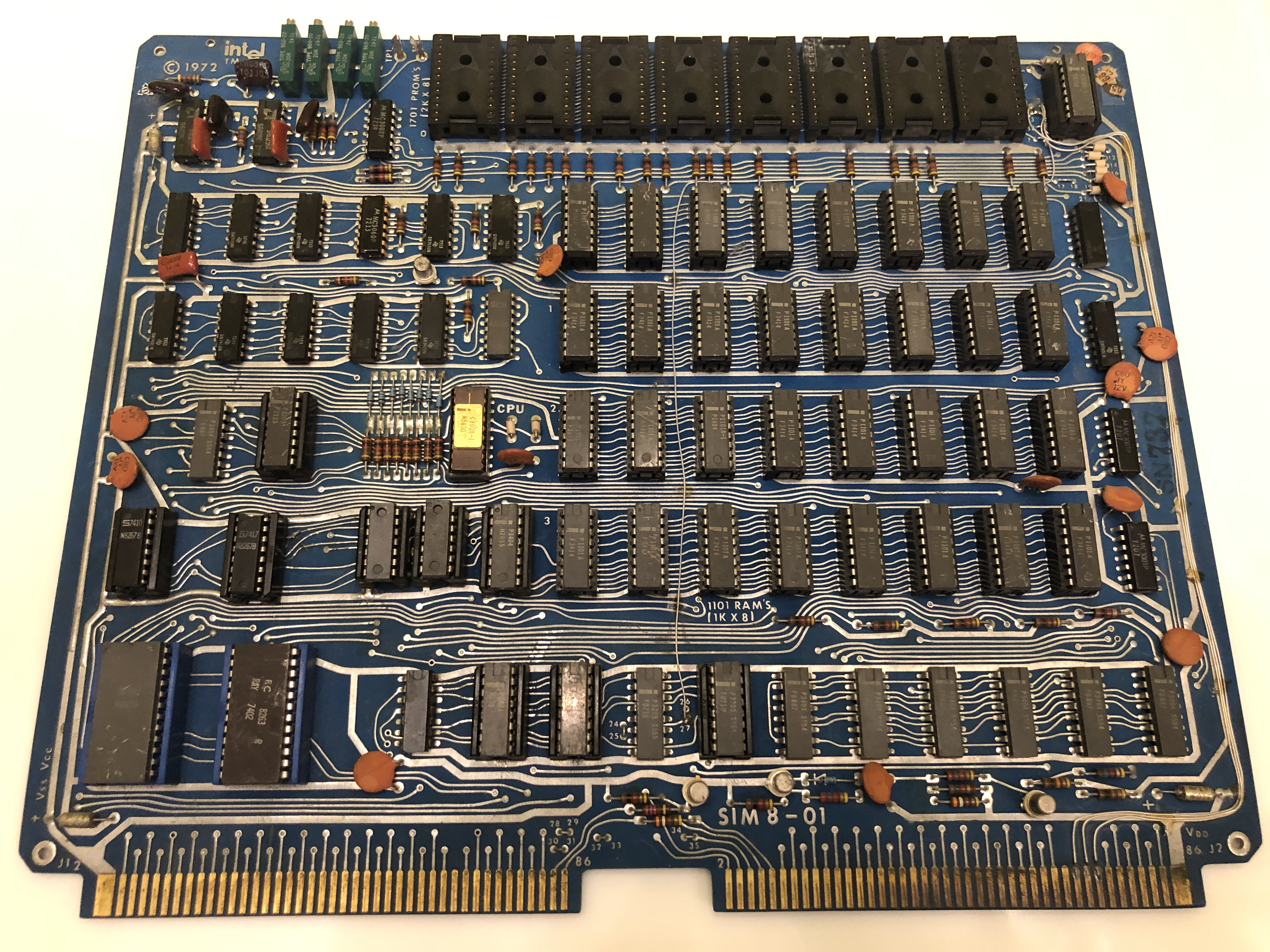
Intel SIM8-01, Dated 1972

This was Intel’s first 8-bit microprocessor based development system. This board contains the CPU, RAM, ROM, and TTY terminal interface all on-board and can hence run as a single board. It features 1K byte of RAM in 32 chips and 2K bytes of EPROM in eight chips.

A PROM programmer board was available (the MP7-0x) and connected via a Micro Computer Connector Board (the MCB-810).

Although not marketed as such, the SIM8-01 represents the first 8-bit microprocessor based Single Board Computer (SBC) available as early as April 1972, priced at $900 ($2,850 in 2022).

== SDK-80 ==
Intel SDK-80, assembled

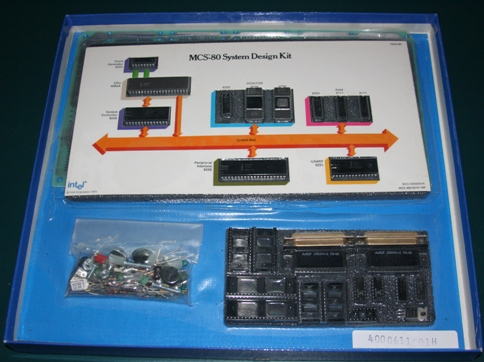
Intel SDK-80, unassembled

The 8080 System Design Kit (SDK-80) of 1975 provided a training and prototype vehicle for evaluation of the Intel 8080 microcomputer system (MCS-80), clocked at 2.048 MHz. (The basic 8080 instruction cycle time was 1.95 μs, which was four clock cycles.) The SDK-80 allowed interface to an existing application or custom interface development. A monitor ROM was provided.

- RAM 256 bytes expandable to 1 KB
- ROM 2 KB expandable to 4 KB
- Dimensions: 12 (W) × 0.5 (D) × 6.75 (H) inch
- I/O ports: parallel (24 lines expandable to 48 lines), serial up to 4800 baud

== SDK-85 ==
Intel SDK-85 Kit

Assembled Intel SDK-85

The SDK-85 MCS-85 System Design Kit was a single board microcomputer system kit using the Intel 8085 processor, clocked at 3 MHz with a 1.3 μs instruction cycle time. It contained all components required to complete construction of the kit, including LED display, keyboard, resistors, caps, crystal, and miscellaneous hardware. A preprogrammed ROM was supplied with a system monitor. The kit included a 6-digit LED display and a 24-key keyboard for direct insertion, examination, and execution of a user's program. It also had a serial transistor interface for a 20 mA current loop teletype using the bit-serial SID and SOD pins on the CPU. The maximum user RAM for programs and data, on the factory standard kit, was limited to 0xC2 or 194 decimal bytes. The full 256 bytes was available on the expansion RAM. User programs could call subroutines in the monitor ROM for functions such as: serial in/out, CRLF, read keyboard, write display, time delay, convert binary to two-character hexadecimal etc.

- RAM 256 bytes expandable to 512 bytes with another 8155 RAM / 22 programmable IO lines. The 14-bit programmable Timer/Counter was used for system single-step control. The expansion Timer/Counter was available.
- ROM 2 KB expandable to 4 KB with another 8755 EPROM / 16 programmable IO lines in the expansion socket.
- Dimensions: 30.5 (W) × 25.7 (D) × 1.3 (H) cm.

== SDK-86 ==
Intel SDK-86

The SDK-86 MCS-86 system design kit is a complete single board 8086 microcomputer system in kit form. It contains all necessary components to complete construction of the kit, including LED display, keyboard, resistors, caps, crystal, and miscellaneous hardware. Included are preprogrammed ROMs containing a system monitor for general software utilities and system diagnostics. The complete kit includes an 8-digit LED display and a mnemonic 24-key keyboard for direct insertion, examination, and execution of a user's program. In addition, it can be directly interfaced with a teletype terminal, CRT terminal, or the serial port of an Intellec system. The SDK-86 is a high performance prototype system with designed·in flexibility for simple interface to the user's application.

The SDK-86 (system design kit) was the first available computer using the Intel 8086 microprocessor. It was sold as a single board kit at a cheaper price than a single 8086 chip because Intel thought that the success of a microprocessor depends on its evaluation by as many users as possible. All major components were socketed and the kit could be assembled by anyone having a limited technical knowledge thanks to a clear and complete assembly manual. The system could be used with the on-board keyboard and display or connected to a serial video terminal.

- The internal ROM monitor offered the following commands:
  - S (substitute memory): displays / modifies memory locations
  - X (examine / modify registers): displays / modifies 8086 registers
  - D (display memory): displays memory content
  - M (move): moves block of memory data
  - I (port input): receives data from input port
  - O (port output): send data to output port
  - G (go): execute user program
  - N (single step): execute single program instruction
  - R (read file): read object file from tape to memory
  - W (write file): writes block of memory to tape
- Technical information:
  - Type Home Computer
  - Origin US
  - Year 1979
  - Built-in language ROM Monitor
  - Keyboard Hexadecimal 24 keys
  - CPU Intel 8086
  - Freq. 2.5 or 5 MHz (jumper selectable)
  - RAM 2 KB expandable to 4 KB
  - ROM 8 KB (Monitor)
  - Text modes 8-digit led
  - I/O ports: Processor bus, parallel and serial I/O
  - Power supply + 5V, -12V external AC adaptor
  - Price $780
- Documentation
  - Assembly Manual
  - SDK-86 User's Manual
  - Intel 8086 CPU User's Manual

== ECK-88 ==
The Intel ECK88 8088 educational component kit was released in 1979, and used the 8088 processor.

== HSE-49 ==
The HSE-49 emulator of 1979 was a stand-alone development tool with on-board 33-key keypad, 8-character display, two 8039 microcontrollers, 2K bytes of user-program RAM, a serial port and cable, and a ROM-based monitor which supervises the emulator operation and user interface. The emulator provides a means for executing and debugging programs for the 8048/8049 family of microcontrollers at speeds up to 11 MHz. It interfaced to a user-designed system through an emulation cable and 40-pin plug, which replaced the MCS-48 device in the user's system. Using the HSE-49 keypad, a designer can run programs in real-time or single-step modes, set up to 8000 breakpoint flags, and display or change the contents of user program memory, internal and external data memory, and internal MCS-48 hardware registers. When linked to a host Intellec development system, the HSE-49 emulator system-debugging capabilities, with the development system program assembly and storage facilities, provide the tools required for total product development.

- Freq. 11 MHz
- RAM 2 KB
- VRAM None
- ROM 2 KB
- Dimensions/weight: 14 (W) × 0.5 (D) × 10 (H) inch / 4.0 Ib
- I/O ports: emulation cable and plug and 20 mA current loop or RS232 (jumper selectable)

== MDK-186 ==
Intel MDK-186

Intel MDK-186

- Technical Information:
  - Name MDK-186
  - Type Design Kit Microcomputer
  - Origin US
  - Keyboard None
  - CPU Intel 80186
  - Coprocessor Intel 808

== MDK-286 ==
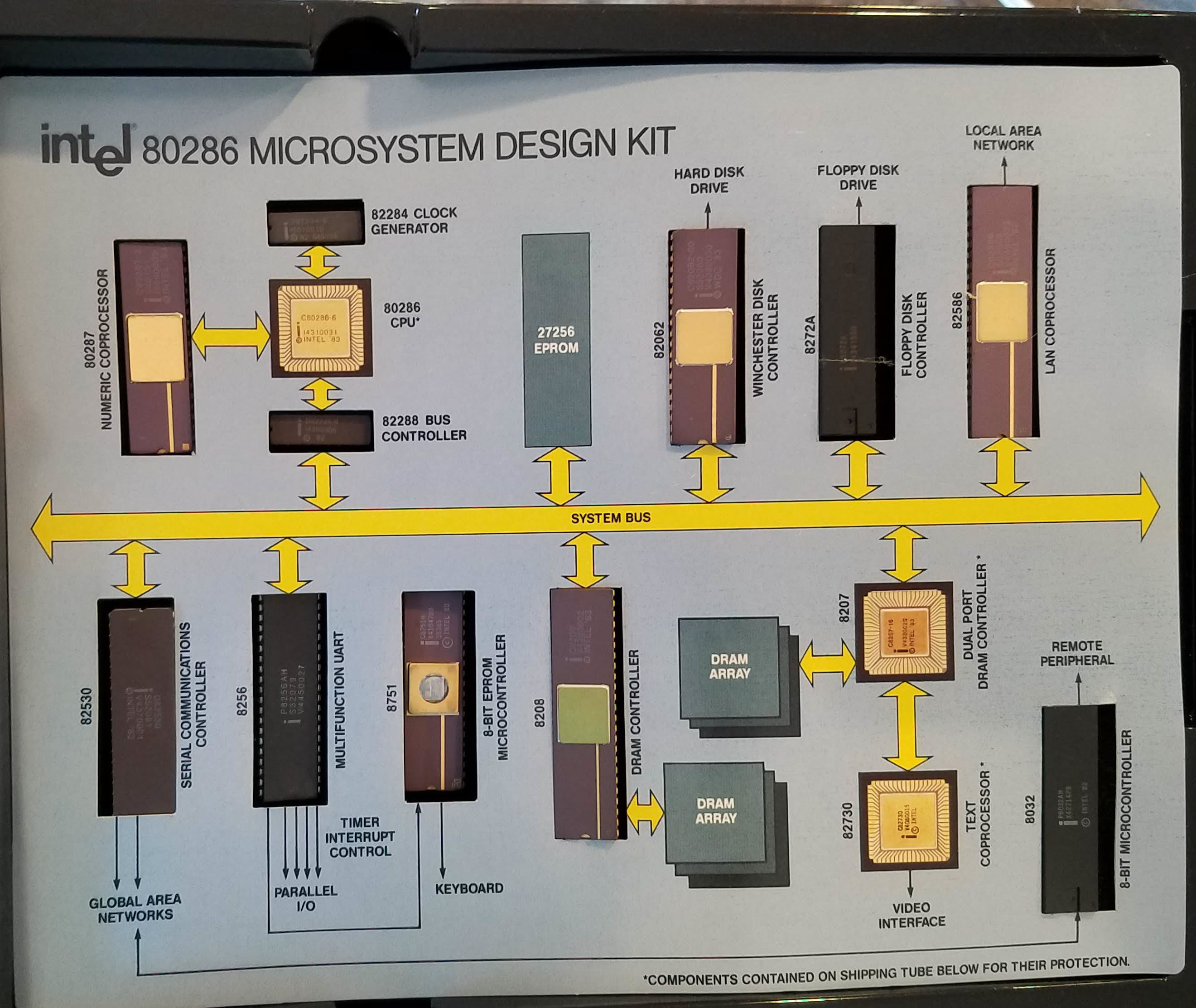
Intel 80286 microsystem design kit

- Technical Information:
  - Type Design Kit Microcomputer
  - Origin US
  - BUILT IN LANGUAGE Monitor in ROM
  - CPU Intel 80286
  - Coprocessor Intel 8087

== SDK-51 ==
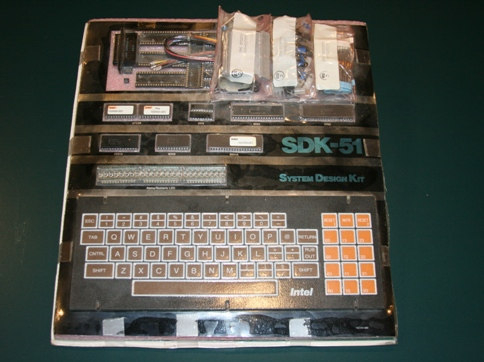
Intel SDK-51

Intel SDK-51

The SDK-51 MCS-51 System Design Kit, released in 1982, contains all of the components of a single-board computer based on Intel's 8051 single-chip microcomputer, clocked at 12 MHz. The SDK-51 uses the external ROM version of the 8051 (8031). It provides a serial port which can support either RS232 or current loop configurations, and also an audio cassette interface to save and load programs. Unlike some of Intel's other SDKs (e.g. SDK-85, SDK-86), the built-in monitor can only be controlled via the built-in QWERTY keyboard and cannot be commanded via the serial port. However, memory dumps and disassembly listings can be dumped out to the serial port, and it can also be used to transfer data to/from a connected PC in the form of Intel hex files.

- Technical Information:
  - RAM up to 16 KB (1KB factory fitted)
  - ROM up to 8 KB expansion
  - Dimensions: 12 (W) × 14 (D) × 2 (H) inch
  - I/O ports: parallel (32 lines), serial (RS232/current loop) up to 9600 baud
  - Keyboard Standard Qwerty layout with additional 12 button keypad
  - Display 24 alpha/numeric 18 segment LEDs
  - OS 8K Monitor in ROM
  - Power supply External 5V 3A/ +12V, -12V 100mA power supply unit
  - Peripherals Expansion area on board
  - Price $1200 in the US
- Documentation
  - Assembly Manual
  - User Manual

== EV80C196KB Microcontroller Evaluation Board ==
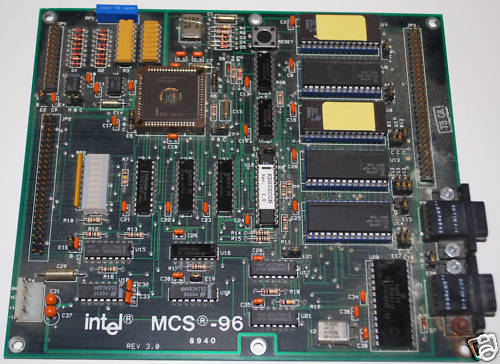
Intel EV80C196KB Microcontroller Evaluation Board

- Technical Information:
  - Type Evaluation Board For Microcomputer
  - Origin US
  - Year 1985?
  - CPU Intel 80C196KB
  - Coprocessor None
  - OS Monitor in ROM
- Documentation
  - User's Manual

== See also ==
- Intellec microcomputer development systems
- Single-board microcontroller
