= Micro 440 =

American computer company

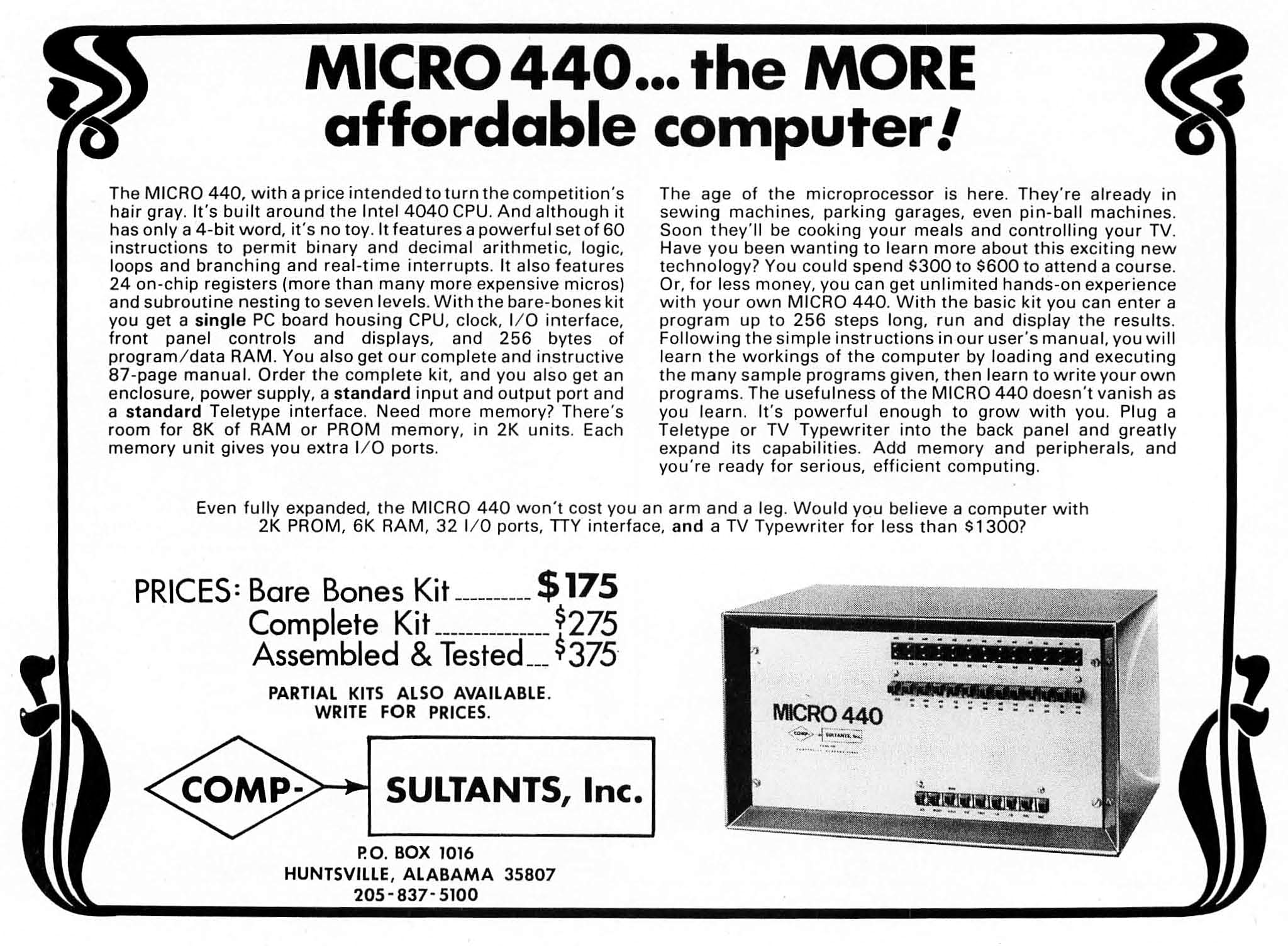
- Advertisement for the Micro 440 in Byte magazine
- Type: Microcomputer
- Released: 1975; 51 years ago
- Lifespan: 1975–1977
- Discontinued: 1977; 49 years ago
- CPU: Intel 4040
- Memory: 256 bytes –8 KB

The Micro 440 was an early microcomputer released by Comp-Sultants, Inc.. Powered by an Intel 4040 microprocessor, it was, by Byte magazine's estimation, the first third-party computer based on that chip. It sold poorly, and the company folded after less than two years, although the Micro 440 found some popularity after its demise among hobbyists as a bare-bones chassis.

== Background and development ==
Comp-Sultants, Inc.
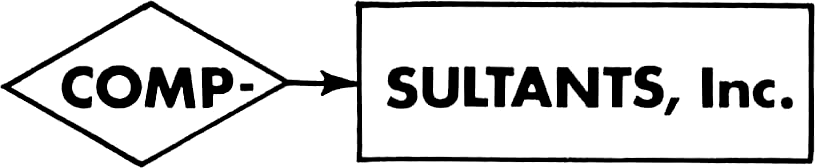
- Company type: Private
- Industry: Computer
- Founded: 1969; 57 years ago in Huntsville, Alabama
- Founders: Paul Bloom; Joanne Bloom; Brian Nelson
- Defunct: 1977; 49 years ago
- Fate: Dissolution
- Products: Micro 440
- Number of employees: 9 (1975)

Comp-Sultants was formally incorporated in Huntsville, Alabama by Paul and Joanne Bloom and Brian Nelson in 1973. Paul Bloom was the company's president and spent the first few years at Comp-Sultants designing early microprocessor-based real-time programmable logic controllers, including one for a cold-forge machine and another for an injection-molding machine. Although the company was incorporated in 1973, according to a classified ad in a 1969 issue of Software Age, the company had been active for four years, offering translation services for software to run on the GE-200 series of mainframe computers.

In early-to-mid 1975, Comp-Sultants previewed the prototype for its Micro 440 at a Huntsville electronics trade show. The Micro 440 was a microcomputer based on Intel's new 4040 microprocessor, the first successor to the 4004 microprocessor, the first commercially produced microprocessor ever made. It was at this trade show that Paul Bloom met Jack W. Crenshaw, a software engineer from Montgomery, Alabama who worked as a professor at the University of Alabama in Huntsville. Eventually Crenshaw was hired as Comp-Sultants' general manager and software developer. The company employed nine people in 1975: Brian Nelson, the Blooms, Crenshaw, one other programmer and four technicians. Crenshaw described the company's laboratory as threadbare:

[Paul]'s "development system" consisted of a 4004-based single-board computer, a primitive ROM-based assembler, and a Teletype ASR-33. ... Our test equipment consisted of an equally primitive bus monitor, a multimeter, and an oscilloscope.

To hold our software, we used UV-erasable EPROMs. But we had no EPROM eraser. Instead, we just put the EPROMs outside, on the hood of someone's car, and let the Sun do the job. Sometimes, the software acted strangely. Do you think maybe a cloud passed over the Sun?

Shortly after Crenshaw joined Comp-Sultants, the company invested in a Intellec 8 Mod 80 development system, allowing him to develop software for the newer Intel 8080. His first project for the 8080 was the firmware for a Kalman filter-based satellite-tracking antenna; an outside client commissioned Comp-Sultants for the firmware after Bloom had won them as a client. The firmware was delivered on time to positive reception from the client. However, further contracts that Bloom had expected to arise from earning this client never materialized. Crenshaw guessed that this was because his firmware was "a little too good." In late 1975, the company finally released its Micro 440 computer, available as a kit or fully assembled.

== Specifications ==
The final design of the Micro 440 featured 256 bytes of RAM, upgradable to 8 KB, a row of toggle switches for inputting data, a bank of LEDs acting as a hardware monitor, ports for I/O peripherals and teletypes and an included PSU board. Optional components included a chassis in which place the boards, memory expansion boards and preprogrammed software on ROM. Comp-Sultants provided a software monitor, debugger and basic source-code editor as optional software on ROM.

On the release of the Micro 440, Byte magazine wrote that it was the first third-party computer based on Intel's 4040 microprocessor. (Note: Intel had earlier released the prefabricated Intellec 4 Mod 40, the first microcomputer based on their 4040 chip, in early 1975.) Although its initial price was only $275—or $100 less than the Altair 8800—the Micro 440 sold poorly, although it became somewhat popular at universities. Crenshaw surmised that the company had miscalculated customers' needs: "We thought that the public wanted lower cost ... In reality, our customers wanted a horsepower race: The more RAM, longer words, and faster clock speed, the better. The hobbyists saw our ads, yawned and moved on." Comp-Sultants eventually sold the kit Micro 440 for as low as $90 ($75 in quantities greater than 10). It was able to lower production costs of the kit units by skipping the process of plating the through-hole vias on the printed circuit boards.

== Legacy ==
By the end of 1977, Comp-Sultants had folded. Creative Computing founder David H. Ahl described Comp-Sultants as "one of the first casualties" of the microcomputer revolution. The Micro 440 eventually became a collector's item, and technologist Michael Nadeau found that many purchasers of the kit version had reused many of its parts in other homebrew computer projects.
