= AMC computerized engine control =

Engine management system developed by American Motors Corporation

The Computerized Engine Control or Computerized Emission Control (CEC) system is an engine management system designed and used by American Motors Corporation (AMC) and Jeep on four- and six-cylinder engines of its manufacture from 1980 until 1987, and then through 1990 by Chrysler after acquiring AMC.

It is one of the three major components for proper engine operation: the computer, electrically controlled carburetor, and the oxygen sensor in the exhaust system. In 1986, AMC advanced to single-point Throttle Body Injection (TBI), enabling an Electronic Control Module (ECM) to manage engine operation.

== Background ==
American Motors Corporation introduced computerized engine controls to reduce emissions while maintaining drivability and performance. Since AMC did not manufacture its own engine computers, it partnered with Ford's Motorcraft division to produce the modules. Early CEC modules featured a standard through-hole circuit board powered by an 8049 variant of the Intel MCS-48. To protect the module from the under-hood environment, the electronic components are encased in a block of hard epoxy.

From 1980 to 1985, the system controlled the carburetor using oxygen sensor feedback to adjust the air-fuel mixture. This technology bridged the gap between carburetors and fuel injection. Sensors and the CEC electronically control the metering jets that act as a valve for fuel flow.

Starting with the 1986 model year, the AMC straight-4 engines used a throttle body injection (TBI) or single-point, fuel injection system with a new fully computerized engine control. In addition to cycling the fuel injector (pulse-width time, on–off), the engine control computer also determined other functions such as the ignition timing, idle speed, exhaust gas recirculation.

== Operation ==
The AMC Computerized Engine Control is an electronic fuel feedback system is similar to those used by other automakers at the time by controlling the amount of gasoline to be atomized by the carburetor by precise electronic calculations. The AMC CEC was unique in that almost all of its sensors and actuators were digital; instead of the usual analog throttle position, coolant temperature, intake temperature, and manifold pressure sensors, it used a set of fixed pressure- and temperature-controlled switches (as well as a wide-open throttle switch on the carburetor) to control fuel mixture and ignition timing. The only analog sensor in the system was the oxygen sensor. In other respects, it was a typical feedback carburetor system of the early-1980s, using a stepper motor to control fuel mixture and a two-stage "Sole-Vac" (which used a solenoid for one stage, and a vacuum motor for the other) to control idle speed. The CEC also controlled ignition timing using information from the fuel-control section and an engine knock sensor on the intake manifold.

The CEC module itself (the most common version of which is the "AMC MCU Super-D") was manufactured for AMC by Ford Motor Company and used a Duraspark ignition system. Although built by Ford, the CEC module is not internally related to the Ford EEC systems.

The AMC CEC went through at least four revisions.

- The first included a "Check Engine" light.
- The second included new process cycles with electric timing retard and the added "Pulse-Air" injection system for emissions control.
- The third version was updated in 1983 to a new style called the C4 system, which used a new microcontroller. The 1983 model year, the 258 cu in (4.2 L) I6 engine featured the MCU-Super D electronics, "Pulse-Air", and an increased compression ratio, from 8.6:1 to 9.2:1.
- The fourth version followed shortly.

== Maintenance ==
The system uses a maze of emissions vacuum hoses. Because of the many vacuum-driven components and electrical connections in the system, CEC-equipped engines have developed a reputation for being hard to tune. American Motors issued a Technical Service Bulletin to diagnose low or inconsistent engine idle speeds on 1980 through 1988 AMC Eagle automobile.

The 49-state model of the CEC lacks an onboard diagnostic system, making it difficult to monitor its operation without a breakout box. The Carter BBD carburetor is a reliable two-barrel downdraft carburetor used extensively on AMC and Jeep vehicles, with many of the 1980 and newer versions incorporating an electronic feedback valve attached to the rear of the throttle body on most CEC-equipped models. These versions may have problems with their idle circuit, which can clog, causing a rough idle and stalling. Other issues may include throttle shaft wear, which can cause the carburetor body to wear, resulting in unmetered air leaking in and a rough idle. Bushings can be installed to resolve this. Improper float heights can cause flooding or fuel starvation, as well as leaking gaskets, all of which need to be corrected for proper CRC performance.

The 49-state model of the CEC lacks an onboard diagnostic system, making it difficult to monitor its operation without a breakout box. The Carter BBD carburetor on most CEC-equipped models also has problems with its idle circuit, which can clog, causing a rough idle and stalling. In places where emissions testing is not required, a modification is made by bypassing the computer and disabling the BBD's Idle Servo, or replacing the BBD with a manually tuned carburetor. Some suggest the "seemingly miles of vacuum hoses and incomprehensible carburetor system" can be modified to enhance performance by replacing AMC's CEC with a better aftermarket system. Several vendors (including Chrysler and Edelbrock) also offer retrofit kits that replace the CEC and the carburetor with fuel injection.
