= Tom Innes =

American computer scientist (died 2019)

Thomas Judson Innes, known as Tom or Tinnes from Bristol, (1944-2019) was an American computer scientist who was one of first employees at Intel. He is best known as the designer of the Intel 4040 processor.

Innes also set up Intel's microprocessor design center in Haifa, Israel and eventually became the General Manager of Intel's Embedded Microprocessor business.

Innes retired from Intel on December 31, 1998. In retirement, he served as a board Director at Primarion, Inc, a board member of the AZ Technology Incubator (1992-1995), and trustee and chairman of the board for the Arizona Science Center.

Innes died on April 7, 2019, after a long illness.
