= Duraspark =

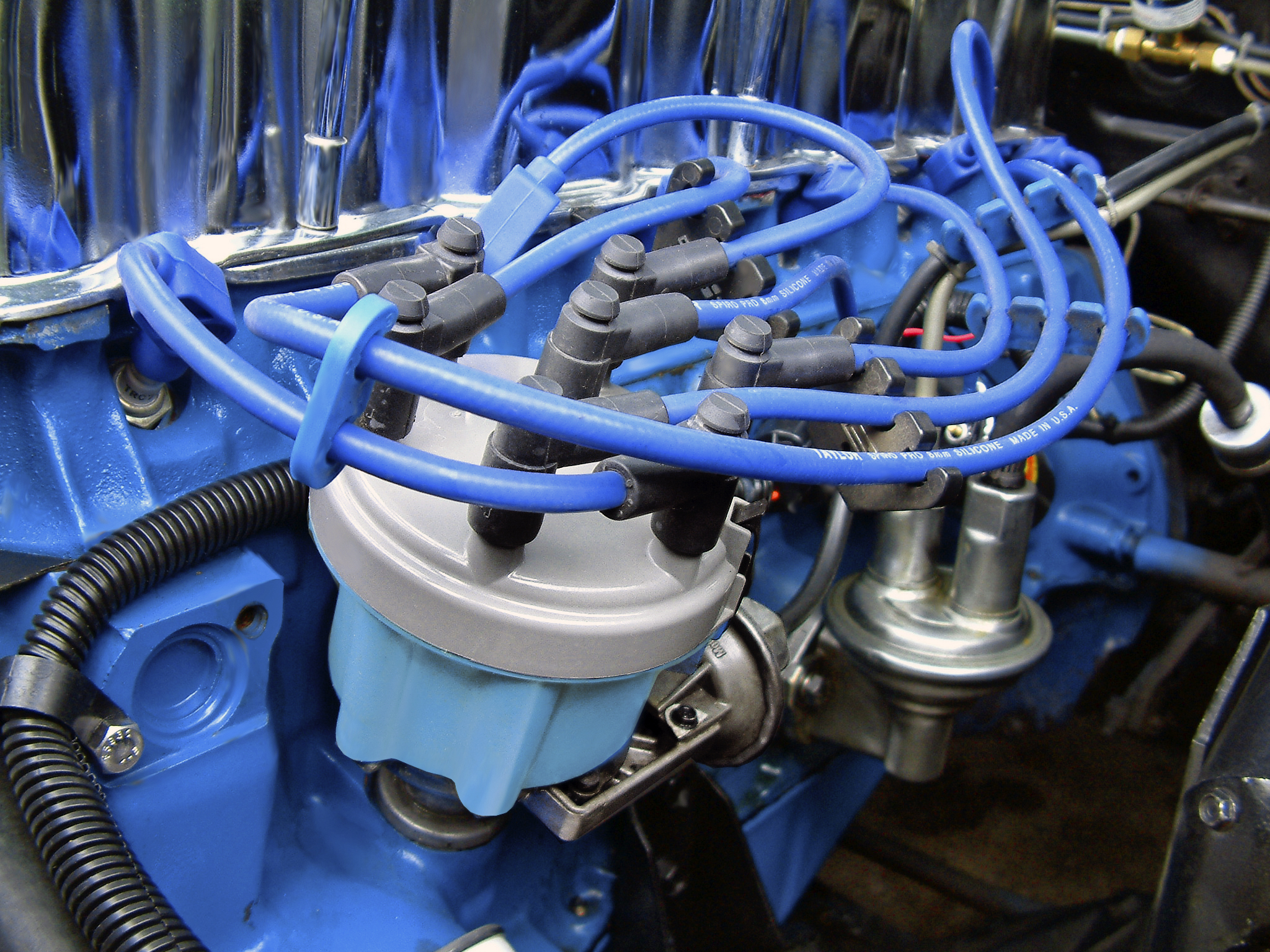
Duraspark II distributor, cap and HT (high tension) wires

The Duraspark II is a Ford electronic ignition system.

Ford Motor Company began using electronic ignitions in 1973 with the Duraspark electronic ignition system and introduced the Duraspark II system in 1976. The biggest change, apart from the control box redesign, was the large distributor cap to handle the increased spark energy.

== Description ==
Ford used several models over the years. They were coded by the color of the plastic wire strain relief, or "grommet" as it is most often called, in order to make them easy to identify. In addition to the color-coding, the modules may have a keyway molded into the electrical connectors to prevent accidental use in the wrong vehicle.

The system consists of a magnetic reluctor and pickup in the distributor, with a separate fender mounted ignition module to trigger the coil. Typically, Duraspark II distributors have both mechanical and vacuum advance mechanisms.

Certain 1981–83 models used the EEC-III system, which uses a Dura-Spark III module (brown grommet where wires emerge) and a Dura-Spark II ignition coil. A resistance wire is used in the primary circuit. The distributors in EEC-III (and later) systems eliminate conventional mechanical and vacuum advance mechanisms. All timing is controlled by the engine computer, which is capable of firing the spark plug at any point within a 50-degree range depending on calibration. This increased spark capability requires greater separation of adjacent distributor cap electrodes to prevent cross-fire, another reason for its large-diameter distributor cap. This system is very similar to the systems used at MSD; MSD used the Duraspark during R&D.

Color	Year(s) Used	OEM no.	Description	Pictures
Black grommet	1974	DY157		
Green grommet	1975	DY166		
Blue grommet	1976–87	DY184	49-state	
Red grommet	1979–83	DY204	California	
Yellow double grommet	1979-81	DY237	Dual-mode	
Brown grommet	1980–83	DY249	Duraspark III, same module used on carbureted ECC-III systems.	
White grommet	1980–83	DY250		

== In the aftermarket ==
The Duraspark II ignition system is a common upgrade for older Ford cars equipped with a points-type ignition. In most cases, the distributor will interchange with the older-style points distributor. The system is similar to some aftermarket systems and the control module may be easily swapped. Duraspark swaps are easy and can be run by a Duraspark box or an aftermarket box. MSD makes a harness that adapts the Duraspark mag pick up right to an aftermarket box such as the 6AL2. Re-curving a Duraspark is a way to build additional power and economy.

== Use by AMC ==
The Duraspark module was used by AMC starting in 1978 and continued to be used with AMC's computerized engine control. The Motorcraft Duraspark system replaced the older Prestolite system in 1978.

AMC used the "blue grommet" module from 1978 and it continued on the carbureted AMC engines through the Chrysler buyout until 1991 for V8 engines and 1990 for inline 6 engines. In 1982 AMC briefly used the "yellow double grommet" module with three connectors in some passenger cars and Jeeps.
