= Intel MCS-96 =

Family of microcontrollers (MCU) commonly used in embedded systems

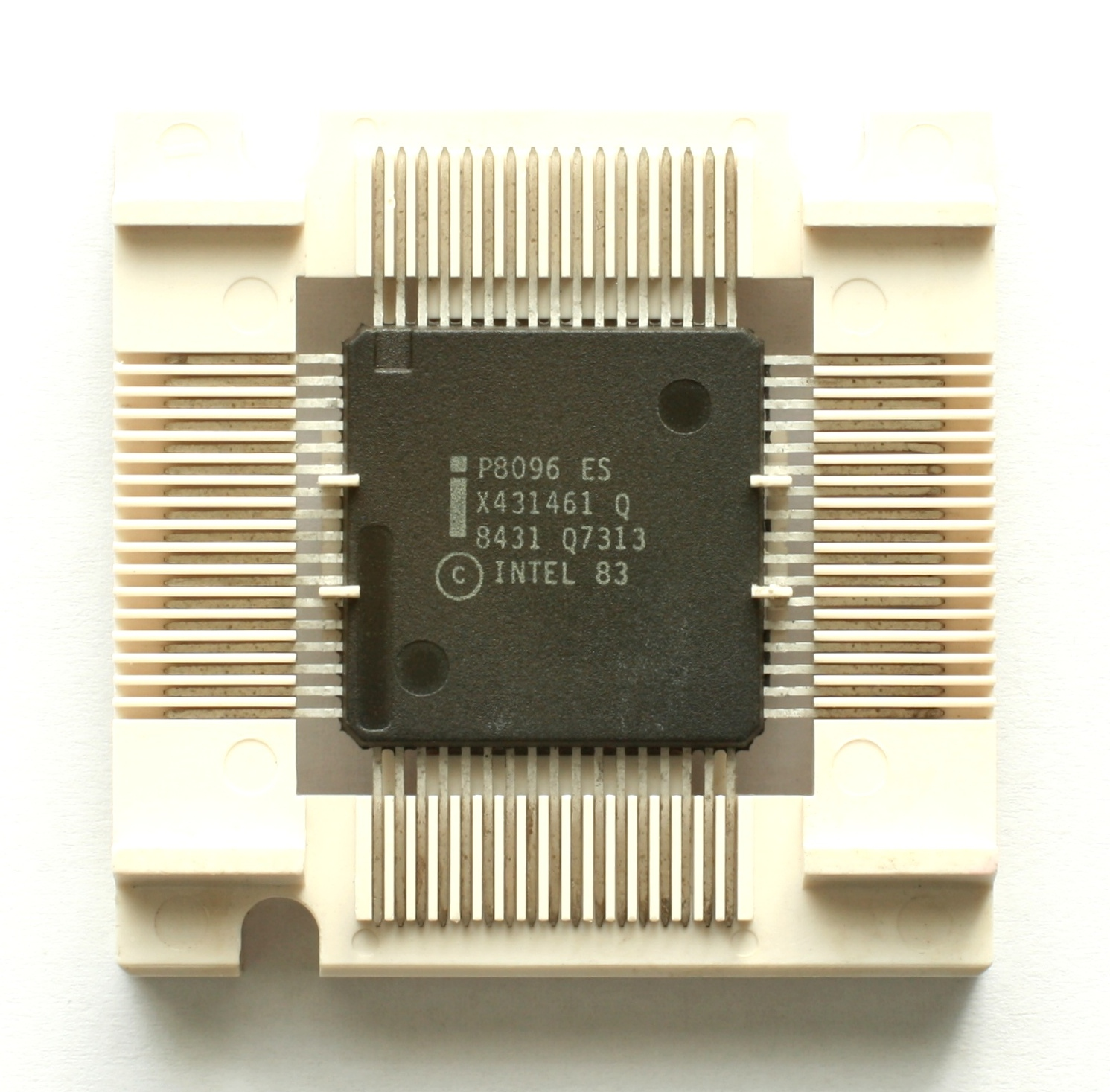
An Intel P8096

The Intel MCS-96 is a family of microcontrollers (MCU) commonly used in embedded systems. The family is often referred to as the 8xC196 family, or 80196, the most popular MCU in the family. These MCUs are commonly used in hard disk drives, modems, printers, pattern recognition and motor control. In 2007, Intel announced the discontinuance of the entire MCS-96 family of microcontrollers. Intel noted that "There are no direct replacements for these components and a redesign will most likely be necessary."

== History ==
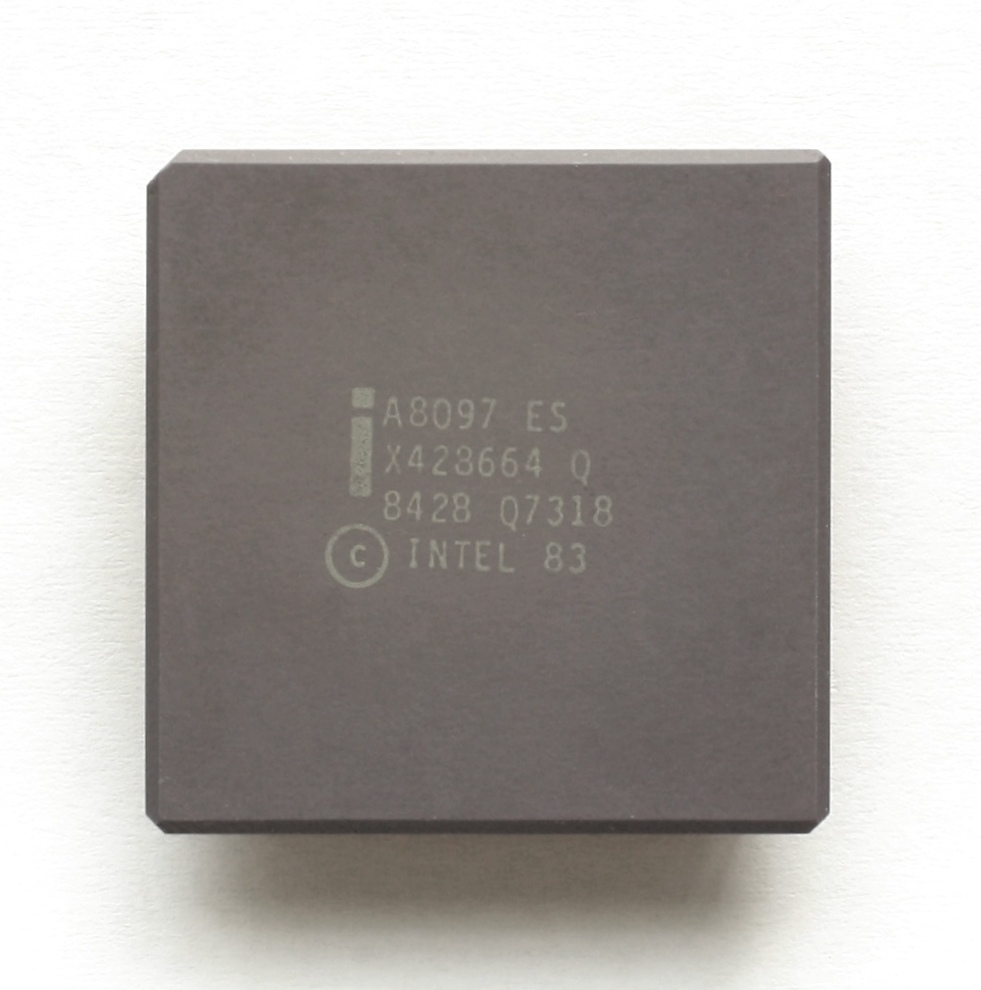
An Intel A8097 CPGA

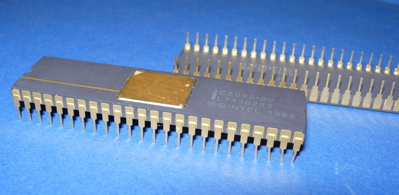
An Intel C8095 in ceramic DIP-48 package

The MCS-96 family originated as a commercial derivative of the Intel 8061, the first processor in the Ford EEC-IV engine controller family. Differences between the 8061 and the 8096 include the memory interface bus, the 8061's M-Bus being a 'burst-mode' bus requiring a tracking program counter in the memory devices. There were also considerable differences in the I/O peripherals of the two parts – the 8061 had 8 HSI (pulse-measurement) inputs, 10 HSO (pulse-generation) outputs entirely separated from the HSI pins, and a non-sampling 10-bit ADC with more channels than the 8096 had. Many differences between the EEC-IV and the 8096 resulted from an effort to share pins to reduce I/O pin count in favor of using the pins for a more conventional memory interface bus. The 8096 also had on-chip program memory lacking in the 8061.

Ford created the Ford Microelectronics facility in Colorado Springs in 1982 to propagate the EEC-IV family, develop other custom circuits for use in automobiles, and to explore the gallium arsenide integrated circuit market. Parts in that family included the 8065, which incorporated a memory controller allowing it to address a megabyte of memory.

The family of microcontrollers are 16-bit, however, they do have some 32-bit operations. The processors operate at 16, 20, 25, and 50 MHz, and are separated into three smaller families. The HSI (high speed input) / HSO (high speed output) family operates at 16 and 20 MHz, and the EPA (event processor array) family operates at all of the frequencies.

The main features of the MCS-96 family include a large on-chip memory, register–memory architecture, three operand instructions, bus controller to allow 8- or 16-bit bus widths, and direct flat addressability of large blocks (256 bytes or more) of memory.

== 809x/839x/879x family ==
The 809x/839x/879x ICs are members of the MCS-96 family. Although MCS-96 is thought of as the 8x196 family, the 8095 was the first member of the family. Later the 8096, 8097, 8395, 8396, and 8397 were added to the family.

The Intel 809x/839x/879x ICs are 12 MHz, 16-bit microcontrollers. The microchip is based on a 5 V, 3 micrometre, HMOS process. The microcontroller has an on-chip ALU, 4 channel 10-bit analog-to-digital converter (ADC), 8-bit pulse width modulator (PWM), watchdog timer, 4 16-bit software timers, hardware multiply and divide, and 8 KB of on-chip ROM. The 8095 is ROMless and has five 8-bit high speed I/O, full duplex serial port, as well as an ADC input and PWM output.

The 8095 comes in a 48-pin Ceramic DIP package, and the following part number variants. C8095-90

== 8x196/8xC196 family ==
The MCS-96 family is generally thought of as the 80C196 IC, even though the family includes the 809x/839x/879x microcontrollers, which came first. Members of this sub-family are 80C196, 83C196, 87C196 and 88C196.

=== Other vendors ===
As of 2021, microcontrollers using the MCS-96 architecture are still being manufactured by NIIET in Voronesh, Russia, as the 1874 series of integrated circuits. This includes a radiation-hardened device with a Spacewire interface under the designation 1874VE7T (Russian: 1874ВЕ7Т). Cobham (formerly Aeroflex) manufactured another radiation-hardened MCS-96 microcontroller until about 2020.

== Example code ==
The following assembler source code is for a subroutine named memcpy that copies a block of data words of a given size from one location to another. The data block is copied one word at a time. This routine assumes some register memory has been defined as AX, BX, CX, and DX word "registers" starting at 0x1A.

 
 
 
 
 
 
 
 
1000
1000  A2 1D 1A
1003  C2 1A 21
1006  E1 1E F7
1009  F0
100A

; memcpy --
; Copy a block of memory words from one location to another. 
;
; Entry registers
;       BX - Address of source data block
;       DX - Address of target data block
;       CX - Number of words to copy

            ORG     1000h
MEMCPY:     LD      AX,[BX]+     ;Copy word from [BX] to [DX]
            ST      AX,[DX]+     ;via AX, bumping pointers
            DJNZW   CX,MEMCPY    ;Loop CX times (word counter)
            RET                  ;Return
            END

== See also ==
- Intel PL/M-96
