= SELF-SCAN =

Family of plasma display formats

SELF-SCAN is a family of plasma displays introduced by Burroughs Corporation during the 1970s. The most common format was a single-row dot matrix display in sizes from 16 to 40 ASCII characters wide. Other formats were also produced, including the SELF-SCAN II 40 wide by 12 or 6 line high displays, and a variety of custom displays showing gauges or pointers.

The SELF-SCAN displays were an important stepping-stone technology between printer-based teletype-like terminals of the 1960s and the widespread use of cathode ray tube (CRT) displays from the mid-1970s on. They were often used for operator terminals on mainframe and minicomputers, and after that continued to see some use in demanding environments where their thinness, on the order of 1 inch, and resistance to interference from magnetic and electric fields that cause problems for CRTs.

The introduction of low-cost liquid crystal displays (LCD)s replaced plasma displays in these uses by the mid-1990s.
