= Intellec =

1970s series of Intel microcomputers

Intel Intellec
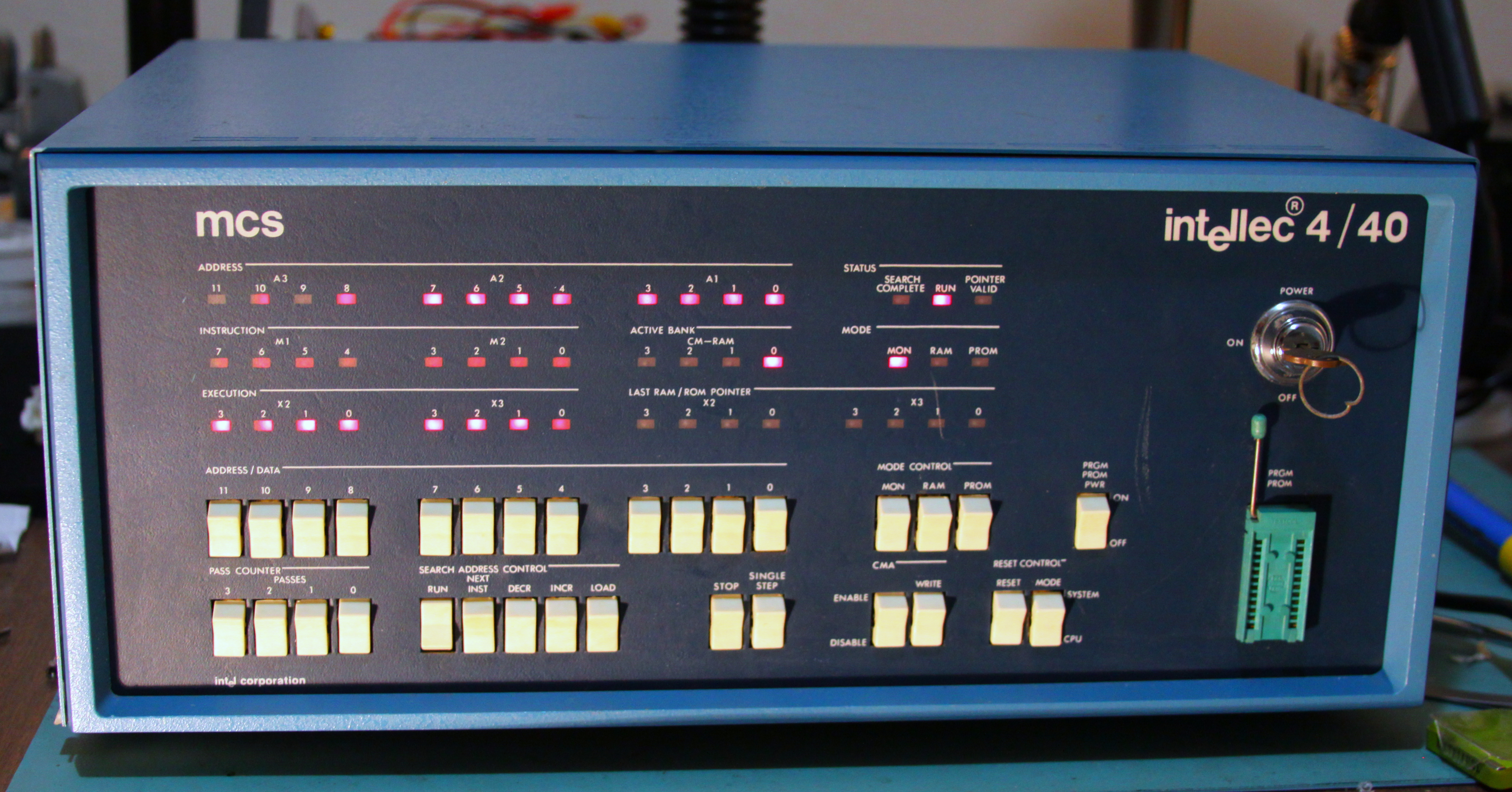
- Intel Intellec 4 Mod 40
- Also known as: Intellec 4 Mod 40, Intellec 8 Mod 80, Intellec MCS4/MCS8
- Manufacturer: Intel
- Type: Microcomputer
- Released: 1973 (1972)
- Introductory price: $2395
- Media: Floppy disk, paper tape
- CPU: Intel 4004, Intel 4040, Intel 8008 or Intel 8080
- Memory: 5 K standard, expandable up to 16 K for the Intellec 8
- Storage: ROM, PROM, RAM
- Input: Front panel switches, optional terminal interface
- Dimensions: 7 in. × 17 in. × 14 in.
- Weight: 14 kilograms (31 lb)

The Intellec computers were a series of early microcomputers produced by Intel in the 1970s as a development platform for their processors. The Intellec computers were among the first microcomputers ever sold, predating the Altair 8800 by at least two years.

== Introduction ==
The first series of Intellecs included the Intellec 4 for the 4004, the Intellec 4 Mod 40 for the 4040, the Intellec 8 for the 8008, and the Intellec 8 Mod 80 for the 8080.

The Intellec 4 and 8 were introduced at the June 1973 National Computer Conference in the New York Coliseum. The Intellec computers were not sold to the general public, only to developers, and a very limited number were built. The Intellec 8 retailed for $2,395.

== Features ==
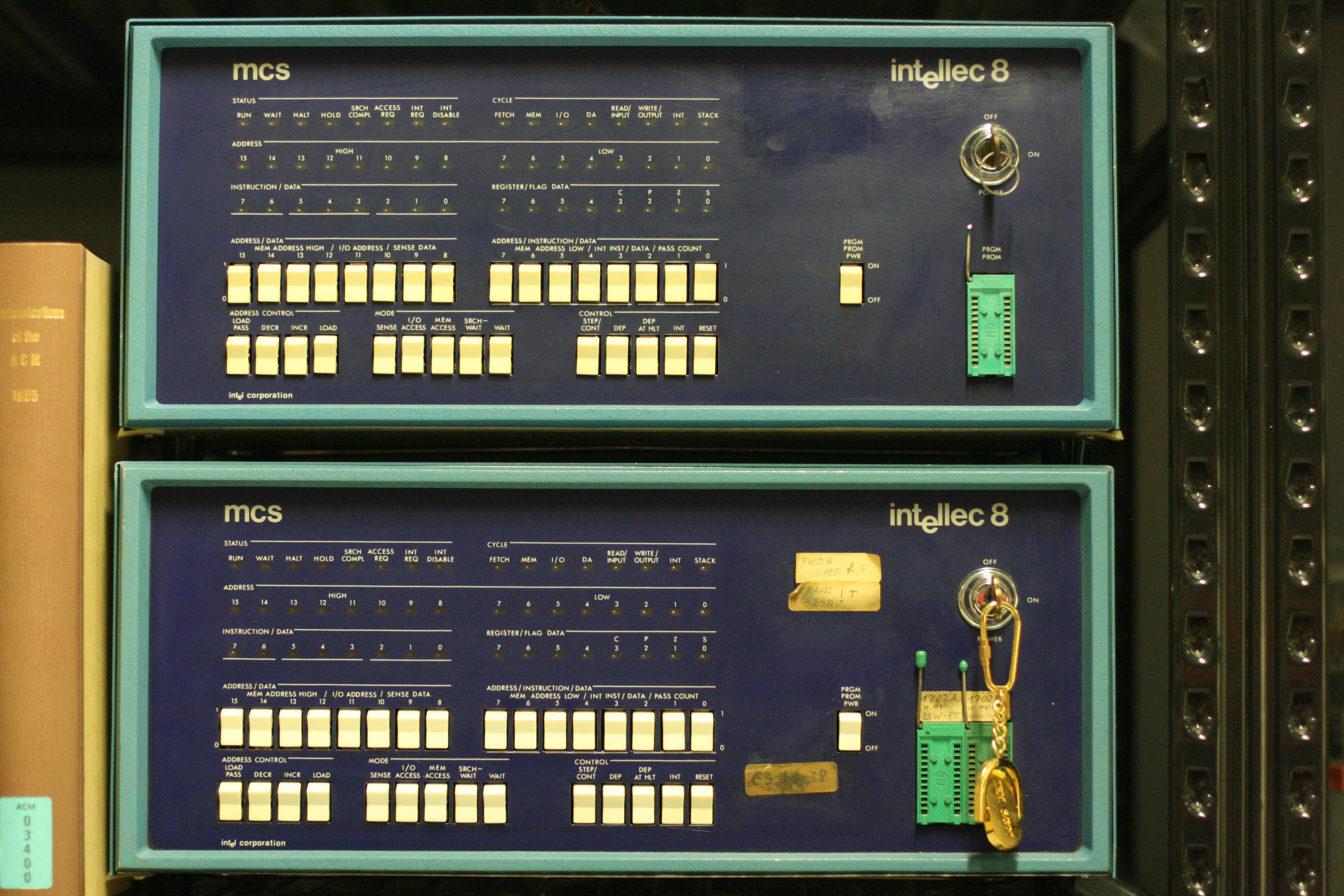
Two Intellec 8 computers

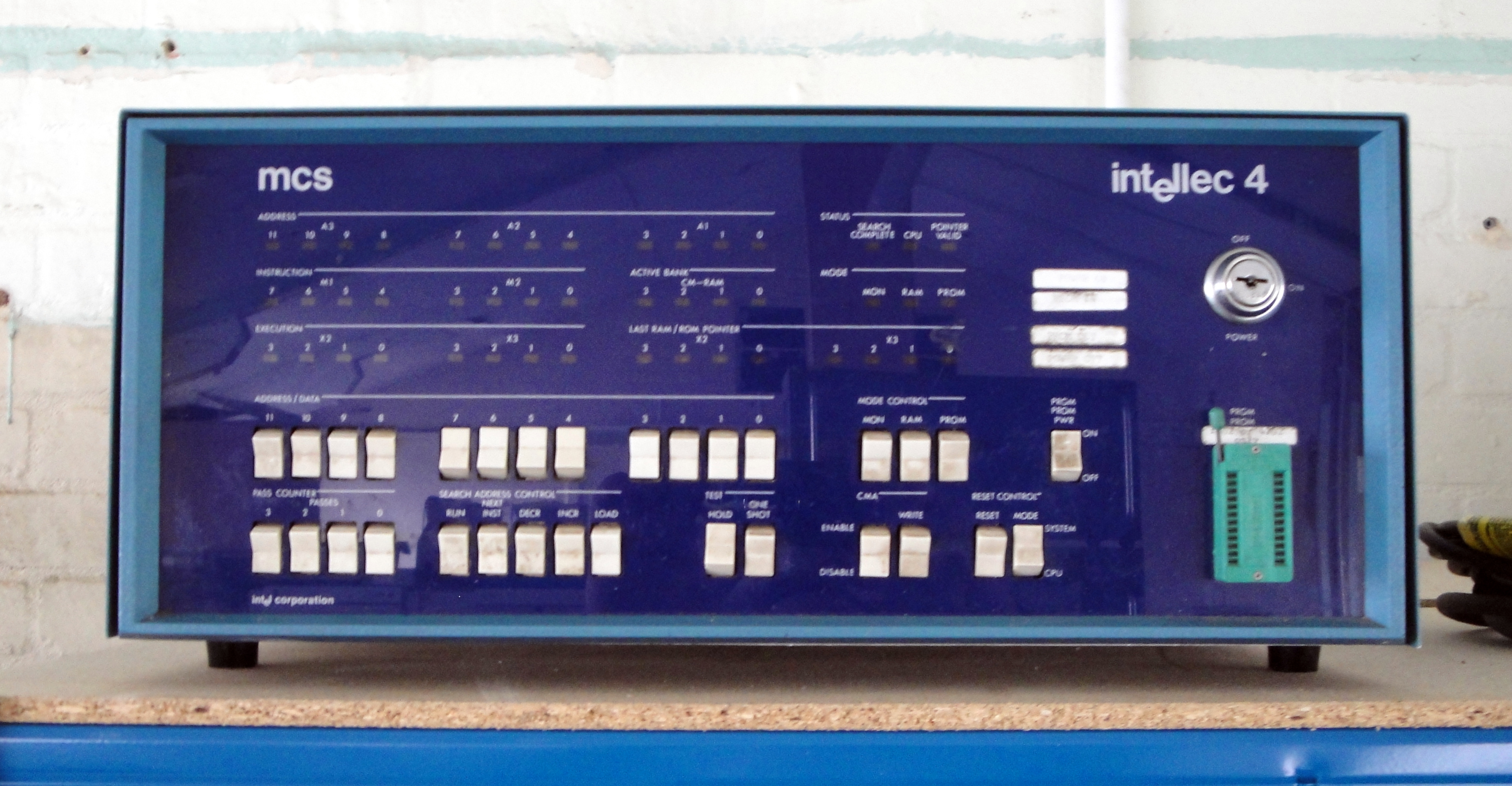
Intellec 4

The Intellecs have resident monitors stored in ROMs. They also included an assembler, linker, and debugger, as well as the ability to act as an in-circuit emulator. Additionally, a PL/M compiler, cross-assembler and simulator were available, which allowed writing programs in a higher-level language than assembly. FORTRAN compilers were also available. The Intellec 8 supported a Teletype operating at 110 baud, a high speed punched paper tape reader and a CRT terminal at 1200 baud.

The Intellec 8 is able to address up to 16 K of memory and came with 5 K pre-installed. The Intellec 4 came with 1 K of PROM and 4 K of RAM for instruction memory, as well as 320 4-bit words of data memory, expandable to 2560 words. The Intellec 8 ran with a two-phase clock of 800 kHz, resulting in an instruction cycle time of 12.5 μs. The Intellec 4 ran at a slower clock rate of 750 kHz, but had a faster instruction cycle time of 10.8 μs. Both systems were available in "Bare Bones" editions, which omitted the front panel, power supply, and completed chassis; instead, it is designed to mount into a rack. Both systems also weighed 14 kilograms (31 lb).

== Usage ==
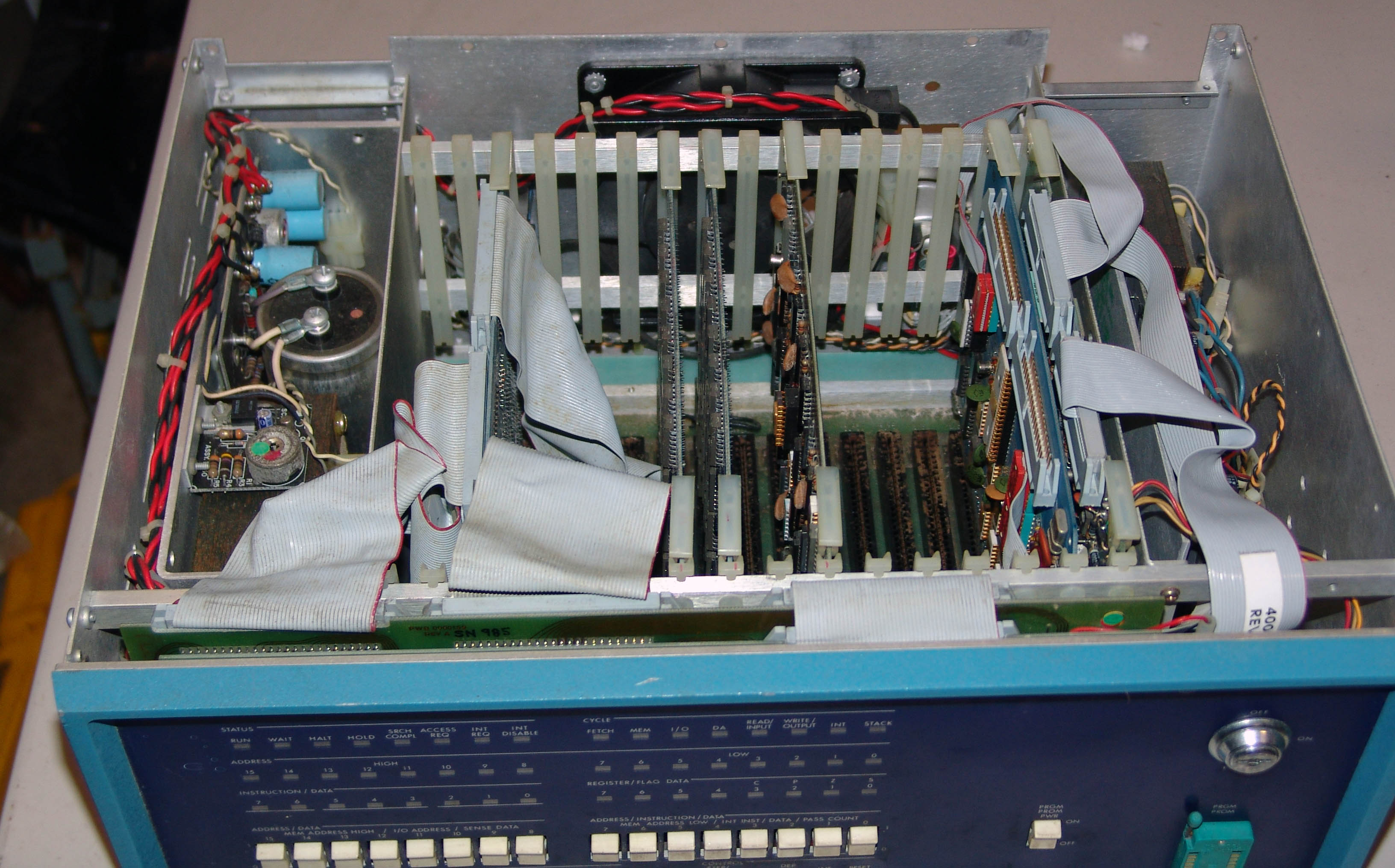
Intel MCS8 Intellec microcomputer with the cover removed

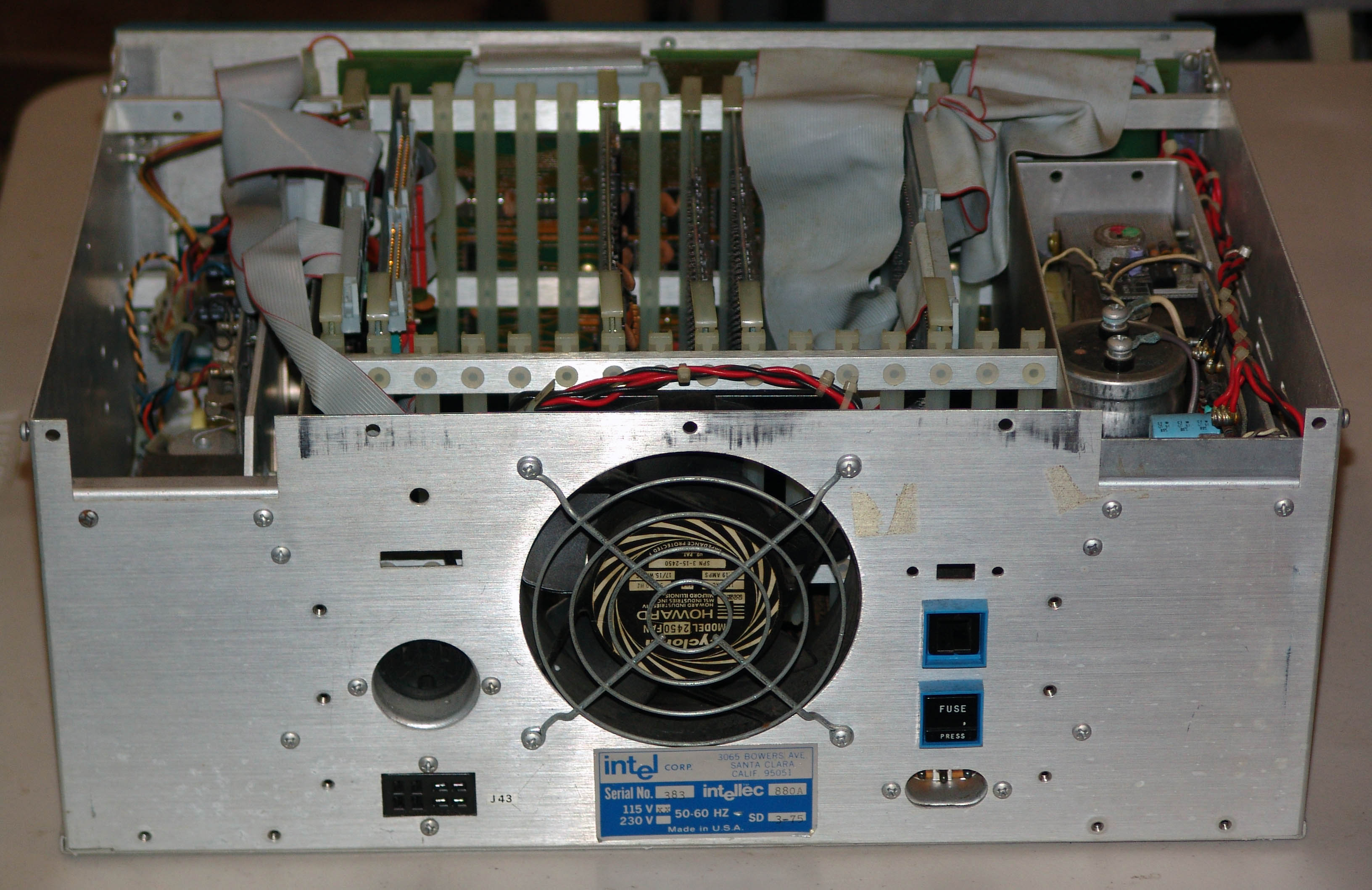
Intel MCS8 Intellec microcomputer showing the rear of the chassis

Intel did not market the Intellec as a general-purpose microcomputer, but rather as a development system. As the first microprocessors were intended to run embedded systems such as in calculators, cash registers, scientific instrumentation, computer terminals, printers, plotters, industrial robots, synthesizers, game consoles, and so on, the Intellec was used for programming programmable memory chips used by embedded systems, e.g. the 2048-bit (256-byte) Intel 1602A programmable read-only memory (PROM) or erasable 1702A EPROM chips which were plugged into a ZIF socket on the Intellec-8's front panel. The chip-programming socket is the green device in the lower right corner of the Intellec's front panel.

Intel also marketed the Intellec microcomputer development system as a system for developing other OEM microcomputers.

== See also ==
- Intel system development kit
- List of early microcomputers
- ISIS (operating system)
- Intel HEX
