= List of defunct American magazines =

List of American magazine publications which are no longer published

This is a list of American magazines that are no longer published.

== Symbols ==
- $pread (2005-2011)

== 0–9 ==
- 02138 (2006–2008)
- 16 (1957-2001)
- 1984 (1978–1983)
- 291 (1915-1916)
- 3-2-1 Contact, Sesame Workshop (1979–2001)
- '47 (1947–1948)
- 73 (1960-2003)
- 7ball (1995–2004)
- 80 Micro (1980–1988)
- 944 (2001-2011)

== A ==
- A. Magazine (1989–2002)
- A. Merritt's Fantasy Magazine (1949–1950)
- Aboriginal Science Fiction (1986–2001)
- Absolute Magnitude (1993–2006)
- Access: America's Guide to the Internet, Access Media Inc. (1998–2001)
- Action, Scholastic (19??–19??)
- Addicted to Noise, Addicted to Noise (1996–2000)
- Adult Journeys, Judson Press ( –2001)
- Adventist Currents (1983–1988)
- Adventure (1910–1971)
- After Dark (1968–1982)
- Agency, American Association of Advertising Agencies ( –2001)
- Agricultural Museum (1810–1812)
- Ainslee's Magazine (1897–1926)
- Air Progress, Challenge Publications (ISSN 0002-2500) (1938–1997)
- Air Wonder Stories (1929–1955)
- Alcheringa (1979-1980)
- The Aldine (1868–1879)
- AlleyCat News, AlleyCat Information Sciences (1997–2001)
- Alt Variety, Lee Wong. (2012–13)
- The Alternate Source Programmer's Journal (1980–1983)
- Alternative Medicine Advisor, Rebus Inc. (1999–2000)
- The Amateur Astronomer (1929–1935)
- Amazing Computing (1985–1999)
- Amazing Heroes, Fantagraphics Books (1981–1992)
- Amazing Stories (1926–2005)
- American Angler (1978-2020)
- The American Boy (1899–1941)
- American Health, Reader's Digest Association, (1981–1999) (folded into Health)
- The American Home (1928–1977)
- The American Jewess (1895–1899)
- The American Magazine (1904–1956)
- American Magazine of Useful and Entertaining Knowledge (1834–1837)
- The American Mercury (1924–1981)
- The American Museum (1787–1792)
- American Review (1967–1977)
- The American Review (1933–1937)
- The American Review: A Whig Journal (1845–1849)
- American Thunder (2004)
- American Way (1966-2021)
- The American Weekly (1896–1966)
- Amerika (1944–1994)
- Amiga World (1985–1995)
- Analectic Magazine (1813–1820)
- ANALOG Computing (1981–1989)
- Anime Insider (2001–2009)
- ANSWER Me! (1991–1994)
- Antaeus (1970–1994)
- Antic (1982–1990)
- Anything That Moves (1990–2002)
- Aperitif Magazine
- Appleton's Magazine (1869–1909)
- Aqua, Islands Publishing Co. (1998–2000)
- Ares (1980–1984)
- Argosy (1882–1978)
- The Arkham Collector (1967–1971)
- The Arkham Sampler (1948–1949)
- Army Man (1988–1990)
- Art Amateur (1879–1903)
- ArtByte, Fanning Publishing Co. Inc. (1998–2001)
- Art Jewelry, Kalmbach Publishing (ceased after March 2016 issue)
- Arthur's Lady's Home Magazine (1852–1898)
- Arthur's Magazine (1844–1846)
- Arts & Architecture (1929–1967)
- Asia (1898–1947)
- Asiaweek, Time Inc. (1975–2001)
- Asimov's SF Adventure Magazine (1978–1979)
- Astonishing Stories (1940–1943)
- Atari Age (1982–1984)
- Atari Connection (1981–1984)
- Audio (1947-2000)
- Autograph Collector Magazine (1986-2017?)
- Automotive News International, Crain Communications (1993–2001)
- Automobile (1996–2020)
- Autoweek (1958–2019)
- Avances Magazine (2007–2012)
- Avon Fantasy Reader (1947–1952)

== B ==
- B. Smith Style, American Express Publishing Corp. (1999–2000)
- Ballyhoo (1931–1939)
- Baltimore Saturday Visiter
- Bananas, Scholastic (1975–1984)
- Barney Magazine (1994–2003)
- Barney Magazine Family (1994–1999)
- Baseball Hobby News (1979–1993)
- Baseball Magazine (1908–1957)
- Battleplan (1987–1989)
- BattleTechnology (1987–1995)
- BB, PRIMEDIA (now Rent Group) Consumer Magazine Group (1987–2000)
- BBW, Various including Larry Flynt Publications Inc. (1979–2003)
- Bead and Button, Kalmbach Publishing (1994-2020)
- Bead Style, Kalmbach Publishing (ceased after March 2016 issue)
- Between C & D (1983–1990)
- Beyond Fantasy Fiction (1953–1955)
- Big Brother (1992–2004)
- Bill Apters W O W Xtra Magazine, H&S Media Inc. (2000–2001)
- The Black Cat (1895–1922)
- Black Issues Book Review (1999–2007)
- Black Mask (1920–1951)
- The Blast (1916–1917)
- Blazing Combat (1965–1966)
- Blip (1983)
- BLK (1988–1994)
- Blodau Yr Oes (1872–19??)
- Blue (1997–2000)
- Blue Book (1905–1975)
- The Boardgamer (1995–2004)
- Boardwatch (1987–2002)
- Body+Soul (2002–2010)
- Boing Boing (1988–1996)
- Boise Magazine, Boise Magazine LLC (1997–2001)
- Bold, Davis Media Group (2000–2001)
- Bomb Rack (1945–1946)
- The Bookman (1895–1933)
- Bop (1983-2014)
- Borzoi International, Borzoi International Inc. (1988–2001)
- Boston Business Forward, Business Forward Media Inc. ( –2001)
- Boston Magazine (1783–1786)
- The Boston Miscellany (1842–1843)
- Boston Monthly Magazine (1825–1826)
- Boston Weekly Magazine (1802–1808)
- Bower of Taste (1828–1830)
- Bradley His Book (1896–1897)
- Brainstorm NW (1997–2009)
- Brill's Content Magazine, Steven Brill (1998–2001)
- Broadway Journal (1844–1846)
- Broom: An International Magazine of the Arts (1921–1924)
- Burr McIntosh Monthly (1903–1910)
- Burton's Gentleman's Magazine (1837–1841)
- Business 2.0, Time Inc. (1995–2001) (folded into eCompany Now)
- Business Nashville ( –2001)
- Bust, Razorfish Studios (1993–2001)
- Byte, UBM plc (1975–1998)

== C ==
- C/C++ Users Journal (1981–2006)
- C++ Report (1989–2002)
- Cablevision Magazine (??–2001)
- Calico Print ( –1953)
- California (1976–1991)
- California Pelican (1903–1988)
- The Californian (1880–1882)
- Captain Future (1940–1944)
- Careers and the Engineer, Crimson & Brown Associates ( –2000)
- The Caribbean Pioneer (19??-2005)
- Caribbean Travel & Life (1986–2013)
- Cartoons Magazine (1912–1922)
- Castle of Frankenstein (1962–1975)
- Catholic Digest (1936-2020)
- Cats Magazine, PRIMEDIA Special Interest Group (1945–2001)
- CD-ROM Today (1993–1996)
- The Century Magazine (1881–1930)
- The Chap-Book (1894–1898)
- Charley Jones' Laugh Book Magazine (1943–ca.1965)
- Chelsea (1958-2007)
- Cicada (1998-2018)
- The Chicagoan (1926–1935)
- Child (1986–2007)
- Children's Digest (1950–2009)
- The Children's Friend (1902–1970)
- Cinefantastique (1967–2006)
- Civil War Times (1962–2024)
- Civilization, U.S. Library of Congress (1994–2000)
- Clamor (1999–2006)
- Classic American Home, Hearst Corp. (1975–2001)
- Classic Style Magazine (2006–2008)
- The Class Struggle (1917–1919)
- CLUTCH (1991–1998)
- Code, Larry Flynt Publications Inc. (1999–2001)
- CoEvolution Quarterly (1974–1984)
- Coins (1955–2023)
- College Humor (1920–ca.1945)
- The Colophon, A Book Collectors' Quarterly (1929–1950)
- Columbiad, PRIMEDIA Enthusiast Publications ( –2000)
- Columbian Magazine (1786–1792)
- Comet (1940–1941)
- The Comet (1930–1933)
- The Comics Journal, Fantagraphics Books (1977–2009)
- Comics Scene, Starlog Group (1982–2000)
- Common Lives/Lesbian Lives (1980–1996)
- Compute! (1979–1994)
- COMPUTE!'s Gazette (1983–1995)
- Computer Currents (1993–?)
- Computer Game Review ( –1996)
- Computer Games Magazine (2000–2007)
- Computer Gaming World (1981–2006)
- Computer Language (1984–1993)
- Computer Shopper (1979–2009)
- ComputorEdge Magazine (1983–2007)
- Condé Nast Portfolio (2007–2009)
- Confessions Illustrated (1956)
- Confidential (1952–1978)
- Connections, Atlantic Southeast Airlines ( –2001)
- Consumers Digest (1959–2019)
- Contact Kids, Sesame Workshop (1979–2001)
- Contempo: A Review of Books and Personalities (1931–1934)
- The Contributor (1879–1896)
- Coronet (1936–1971)
- Cosmic Stories (1941)
- Cosmogirl (1999–2009)
- Country Gentleman (1831–1955)
- Country Journal, PRIMEDIA Consumer Magazines & Internet Group (1974–2001)
- Country Life in America (1901–1942)
- Country, The Magazine of the Hamptons, M. Shanken Communications Inc. (1998–2001)
- Country Song Roundup, Country Song Roundup Inc. (1949–2001)
- The Courier (1968–2005)
- Cracked (1958–2007)
- Crazy Magazine (1973–1983)
- Creative Computing (1974–1985)
- Creepy (1964–1983)
- The Cricket ( –ca.1895)
- Crime Illustrated (1955–1956)
- Curio, Curio Magazine Inc. (1996–2000)
- Current Literature (1888–1913)
- Cursor (1978–1982)
- Cycle News (1965–2010)

== D ==
- Dads, Dads Media LLC (2000)
- Daily Mumble
- Dance Music Report (1978–1992)
- Datamation (1957–1998)
- Datebook (ca.1965–ca.1969)
- DDT (ca.1988–2005)
- De Bow's Review (1846–1884)
- The Delineator (1869–1937)
- Dell Pencil Puzzles & Word Games, Dell Magazines ( –2000)
- Desert Magazine (1937–1985)
- Desert Rat Scrap Book (1945–1967)
- Desktop Publishing Magazine (1985–1986)
- Details (1982–2015)
- Detective Book Magazine (1930–1931; 1937–1952)
- Develop (1990–1997)
- The Dial (1840–1929)
- DigitalFOTO, Imagine Media Inc. (2000–2001)
- DigitalSouth, Dbusiness.com (2001)
- The Dinosaur Times (ca. 1992–ca.1993)
- Disney Adventures (1990–2007)
- The Disney Channel Magazine' (1983–1998)
- Disney Magazine (1965–2005)
- ) (1970)
- DMA (1993–2003)
- Doctor Death (1935)
- Dollar Sense, Baumer Financial Publishing (1977–2001)
- Dr. Dobb's Journal (1976–2009)
- Dr. Yen Sin (1936)
- Drag Racing USA, McMullen Argus Publishing (1989–2001)
- Dragon (magazine), TSR / WotC / Paizo (1975–2007)
- Dragonsmoke (ca.1974–ca. 1979)
- The Dude (1956–ca.1976)
- Dynamic Science Fiction (1952–1954)
- Dynamic Science Stories (1939)
- Dynamite, Scholastic (1974–1992)

== E ==
- eBay Magazine, Krause Publications Inc. (1999–2000)
- eCommerce Business, Cahners Business Information ( –2001)
- Eerie (1966–1983)
- EGM² (1994–1998)
- The Electric Company Magazine, Scholastic (1972–1987)
- Electrical Experimenter (1913–1920)
- Electronic Cottage (1989–1991)
- Electronic Games (1981–1985)
- Electronics (1930–1995)
- Electronics Illustrated, Fawcett Publications (1958–1972)
- Elle Girl (2001–2006)
- Emerge (1989–2000)
- Emigre (1984–2005)
- Ensign (1971-2020)
- Enter, Sesame Workshop (1983–1985)
- Escape, Escape Magazine Inc. (1994–2000)
- ESPN The Magazine (1998–2019)
- Eternity (1950–1988)
- Eternity SF (1972–1980)
- The Etude (1883–1957)
- eV, Cahners Business Information (2000–2001)
- Evangelica (1980–1987)
- Every Saturday (1866–1874)
- Everybody's Magazine (1899–1929)
- Expedia Travels, Ziff-Davis Media (2000–2001)
- Expert Gamer (1998–2001)
- Eye, Hearst Corporation (1968–1969)
- Eye (Greensboro), Eye Inc. (1992–2000)

== F ==
- Fact (1964–1967)
- Factsheet Five (1982–1998)
- Fame and Fortune Weekly (1909–1928)
- Family Circle Christmas Helps & Holiday Baking, Family Circle Inc. (1954–2001)
- Family Computing (1983–1988)
- Family Life, Time Inc. (1993–2001)
- Family Money, Meredith Corp. (1997–2001)
- FamilyPC (1994–2001)
- Famous Fantastic Mysteries (1939–1953)
- Famous Monsters of Filmland (1958–1983)
- Fantastic (1952–1980)
- Fantastic Adventures (1939–1953)
- Fantastic Films (1978–1985)
- Fantastic Novels (1940–1941; 1948–1951)
- Fantastic Story Magazine (1950–1955)
- Fantastic Universe (1953–1960)
- Fantasy Fiction (1953)
- Farm & Fireside (1878–1939)
- Fast Folk (1982–1997)
- The Feet (1970–1973)
- Field and Stream (1895–2015; continues online)
- Film Culture (1955–1996)
- Fire!! (1926)
- Florida Magazine (1900–1903)
- Florida Travel+Life (?–2013)
- Flying Aces (1928–1945)
- FOOM (1973–1978)
- Forced Exposure (1980–1993)
- Forerunner (1909–1916)
- Forgotten Fantasy (1970–1971)
- The Formalist (1990–2004)
- The Forum (1885–1950)
- Four Wheeler (1962-2023)
- Frank Leslie's Illustrated Newspaper (1852–1922)
- Frank Leslie's Popular Monthly (1876–1904)
- Freedomways (1961–1985)
- FringeWare Review (1992–1998)
- Fuse (2000)
- Fuck You (1962–1965)
- Future Life (1978–1981)
- Future Science Fiction (1939–1943; 1950–1960)
- Future Sex (1993–?)

== G ==
- The Galaxy (1869–ca.1879)
- Galaxy Science Fiction (1950–1980)
- Galileo (1976–1980)
- Game Players ( –1998)
- GameFan (1992-2000, 2010-2015)
- GameGO! (2001)
- GameNOW (2001–2004)
- GamePro (1989–2011)
- Games for Windows: The Official Magazine (2006–2008)
- Games Unplugged (2000–2004)
- GameWeek Magazine (1995–2002)
- GAO Journal (1988–1992)
- GAO Review (1966–1987)
- Gavin Report (1958–2002)
- Gay Chicago (1976–2011)
- The General (1964–1998)
- George, Hachette Filipacchi Magazines Inc. (1995–2001)
- Girl Germs (1990–?)
- Glass Collector's Digest, Glass Press Inc. (1987–2001)
- The Glass Eye (1994–2006)
- Gleason's Pictorial Drawing-Room Companion (1851–1859)
- The Glebe (1913–1914)
- Glue, Glue (1997–2001)
- GMR (2003–2005)
- Gnosis (1985–1999)
- Godey's Lady's Book (1830–1898)
- Golden Hours (1889–1901)
- GOSH! (1978–1979)
- Gourmet (1941–2009)
- Grace, Grace Media (2002–2003)
- Graham's Magazine (1840–1858)
- Grand Street (1981–2004)
- Gray Areas (1992–1995)
- Great American Crafts, Krause Publications Inc. (1998–2001)
- Great Chefs, H&S Media Inc. ( –2001)
- Great Grilling, H&S Media Inc. ( –2001)
- Greed Magazine (1986–1989)
- Green, ilife.com (1995–2000)
- The Green Guide, Mothers & Others for a Livable Planet Inc. (1994–2001)
- The Grenadier (1978–1990)
- Groom & Board, H.H. Backer Associates Inc. (1980–2001)
- Growing Without Schooling (1977–2001)
- Guideposts for Kids, Guideposts Associates Inc. ( –2001)
- Guitar for the Practicing Musician (1982–1999)
- Guitar Shop, Cherry Lane Magazines Inc. (1994–2000)
- Gulfscapes Magazine (2001–2012)
- Gunton's Magazine (1891–1904)

== H ==
- Hands-On Electronics (1984–1989)
- The Hard Copy Observer (1991–2012)
- Harp (2001–2008)
- Harper's Weekly (1857–1916)
- Harper's Young People (1879–1899)
- Harvest (1980–1992)
- HDI, CMP Media (1998–2001)
- Healthy Kids, American Baby/American Academy of Pediatrics/PRIMEDIA (1989–2001)
- Helix SF ( –2008)
- Help! (1960–1965)
- Hewlett-Packard Journal, HP (1949–1998)
- Hi (2003–2005)
- High Performance Mopar, PRIMEDIA ( –2001)
- Holiday (1946–1977)
- Holland's Magazine (1876–1953)
- Hollywood Detective (1942–1950)
- Hollywood Star (1976–1981)
- Home Monthly (1896–1900)
- Homes & Ideas, IPC Media (1993–2001)
- Hooey (ca.1931–ca.1935)
- Horizon (1958–1989)
- Horror Stories (1935–1941)
- Hot, H&S Media Inc. (2000–2001)
- Hot Dog!, Scholastic (1979–199?)
- HotDots, Time Inc. (2000–2001)
- Hound & Horn (1927–1934)
- Houston City Magazine (1977–1987)
- huH (1994–?)
- Humbug (1957–1958)

== I ==
- If (1952–1974)
- Ignite Your Faith (1944-2009, former ”Campus Life”, founded as ”Youth for Christ Magazine”)
- Illustrated Police News (ca.1860–1904)
- Imagination (1950–1958)
- Imaginative Tales (1954–1958)
- Imagine (1993-2018)
- Impact Press (1996–2006)
- Improvement Era (1897–1970)
- inCider (1983–1989)
- The Independent (1848–1928)
- Individual Investor, Individual Investor Group (1981–2001)
- The Industry Standard, Standard Media International (1998–2001)
- Infinity (1955–1958)
- .info (1983–1992)
- Injection Molding Magazine (1993–2011)
- Innerloop Magazine (2002–2004)
- InQuest Gamer (1995–2007)
- Inquiry Magazine (1977–1984)
- Insect Trust Gazette (1964–1968)
- Inside Kung Fu (1973–2011)
- Inside Sports (1979–1998)
- The Instructor (1930–1970)
- InStyle (1994–2022)
- Intelligent Enterprise (1998–ca.2007)
- Interactive Week, Ziff-Davis Media (1994–2001)
- Interface Age (1976–1985)
- International Language Review (1955–1968)
- Internet Underground (1996-97)

== J ==
- Jane, Advance Publications (1997–2007)
- Java Report, Sigs Publications Inc. (1996–2001)
- Jem (1956–?)
- John Martin's Book (1912–1933)
- Joystik (1982–1983)
- Judge (1881–1947)
- Jump, Weider Publications (1997–2001) (folded into G+Js YM)
- Juvenile Instructor (1866–1929)
- JVibe (2004-2009)

== K ==
- Kanto Plainsman (1961–1970)
- Ken (1938–ca.1939)
- Kid City, Sesame Workshop (1974–2001)
- Kids (1970s magazine) (1970–1975)
- Kilobaud Microcomputing (1977–1984)
- Kit Car Illustrated ( –ca.2001)
- Kitchen Gardener, Taunton Press ( –2001)
- The Knickerbocker (1833–1865)
- KO Magazine (1980-2007)

== L ==
- L=A=N=G=U=A=G=E (1978–1981)
- La Llumanera de Nova York (1874–1881)
- The Ladder (1956–1970)
- Ladies' Home Journal of Philadelphia
- Ladies' Magazine ( –1836)
- LAN Times (1988–1997)
- Land and Liberty (ca.1914–ca.1915)
- Latin Girl, Latin Girl Magazine (1999–2001)
- Latina (1996-2018)
- Left and Right: A Journal of Libertarian Thought (1965–1968)
- Legion of Doom Technical Journals (ca.1980–ca.2000)
- The Liberator (1918–1924)
- The Libertarian Forum (1969–1984)
- Libertarian Review (1972–1981)
- Liberty (1881–1908)
- Liberty (1924–1950)
- Library (1900)
- Life Magazine (1883–2000)
- Lingua Franca, Academic Partners LLC (1990–2001)
- LiP magazine (1996–2007)
- The Literary Digest (1890–1938)
- The Little Pilgrim (1853–1868)
- The Little Review (1914–1929)
- Living Greyhawk Journal (2000–2004)
- Loadstar (1984–2010)
- Locus Solus (1961–1962)
- Look (1937–1971)
- Lowell Offering (1840-1845)
- Lowrider (1976–2019)

== M ==
- M Magazine (2000-2016)
- M.D. (1955–1956)
- Mademoiselle, Conde Nast (1935–2001)
- The Magazine of American History (1877–1917)
- The Mahogany Tree (1892)
- Manhattan File, Kirchhoff Communications LLC (1994–2001)
- Marie Claire Health & Beauty, IPC Media (1994–2001)
- Marion Zimmer Bradley's Fantasy Magazine (1988–2000)
- Martha Stewart Living (1990–2022)
- Marvel Science Stories (1938–1941; 1950–1952)
- Marvel Tales (1934–1935; 1938–1941; 1950–1952)
- Marvelmania Magazine (1969–1971)
- Mary Beth's Bean Bag World (1997–2001)
- Mary Beth's Teddy Bears & More, H&S Media Inc. (2000–2001)
- Mary-Kate and Ashley Magazine, H&S Media Inc. ( –2001)
- Massachusetts Magazine (1789–1796)
- The Masses (1911–1917)
- The Master Skier (ca.1987–2010)
- Mature Outlook, Merdith Corp./Sears Roebuck Corp. (1983–2001)
- Maximum Golf, News Corp.'s News America Magazines Inc. (2000–2001)
- Maximum Linux, Imagine Media Inc. (2000–2001)
- McCall's (1873–2002)
- McClure's (1893–1929)
- Mechanix Illustrated (1928–2001)
- Men's Vogue (2005–2008)
- Mental Floss (2001–2016)
- Merry's Museum (1841–ca.1872)
- The Messenger (1917–1928)
- Metal Edge (1985–2009)
- Metropolitan Home (1974–2009)
- Metropolitan Magazine (1895–1925)
- MH-18, Rodale (2000–2001)
- Michigan Hunting & Fishing, PRIMEDIA ( –2001)
- Micro Cornucopia (1981–1990)
- Microsystems (1980–1984)
- MicroTimes, PRIMEDIA Haas Publishing Co. ( –2001)
- The Midland (1915–1933)
- Midnight Engineering (1989–2001)
- Might ( –1997)
- Mini Truckin' (1988–2014)
- Mirabella (1989–2000)
- Miracle Science and Fantasy Stories (1931)
- MMO Games Magazine (2006–2007)
- Mobile PC (2004–2005)
- Mode, Lewit & LeWinter Inc. (1997–2001)
- Model Rocketry (1968–1972)
- Modern Electrics (1908–1913)
- Modern Electronics (1984–1991)
- Modern Man (1952–ca.1969)
- Modern Nomad (2001–2004)
- Modern Screen (1930–1985)
- Mondo 2000 (1984–1998)
- Money (1972–2019)
- The Monster Times (1972–1976)
- Monthly Anthology (1804–1811)
- Moody Street Irregulars (1978–1992)
- Mopar Action, Harris (1988–2016), AMG Parade (2016)
- Mothering (1976-2011)
- Motion Picture Herald (1931–1972)
- Motion Picture News (1913–1930)
- Moves (1972–1981; 1991–2002)
- The Moving Picture World (1907–1927)
- Munsey's Magazine (1889–1929)
- Musician (1976–1999)
- Mustang Illustrated, PRIMEDIA ( –2001)
- The Mysterious Traveler (1951–1952)

== N ==
- NASCAR Illustrated (1982–2016)
- NASCAR Scene (1978–2010)
- National Farm Boy Magazine (1921–?)
- National Lampoon (1970–1998)
- Nature Magazine (1923-1959)
- The Nautilus (1898–1953)
- Nemo ( –ca.1989)
- Nest: A Quarterly of Interiors (1997–2004)
- New Age Journal (1974–2002)
- New American Review (1967–1977)
- The New Electric Railway Journal (1988–1999)
- The New England Magazine (1884–1917)
- The New-England Magazine (1821–1835)
- New England Monthly (1984–1990)
- New Era (1971-2020)
- The New Era Illustrated Magazine (1902–1935/6)
- The New Leader (1924–2006)
- New World Writing (1951–1964)
- New York Dog (2004)
- The New-York Magazine (1790–1797)
- New York Sportsman, PRIMEDIA (1972–2001)
- Newtype USA (US edition: 2002-2008)
- Next Generation (1995–2002)
- Nextstep (magazine) (1995–2008(?))
- Niagara Frontier Review (1964–1966)
- Nibble (1980–1992)
- Nickelodeon Magazine (1990–2009)
- Nick Jr. Family Magazine (1999–2008)
- Nick Jr. Noodle (1999–2007)
- Night Sky (2004–2007)
- Nintendo Power (1988–2012)
- Noggin (1990–1993)
- Now Playing (2005–2006)
- Nuestro (1977–ca.1980)
- NutriMag (1999–2001)

== O ==
- o-blek (1987–1993)
- Oceans of the Mind (2001–2006)
- Official Dreamcast Magazine (1999–2001)
- Official SEGA Dreamcast Magazine, Imagine Media Inc. (1999–2001)
- Official Web Guide, PRIMEDIA Haas Publishing Co. ( –2001)
- Official Xbox Magazine (2001-2020)
- Offspring, Hearst Corp. (2000–2001)
- Ole' (1964–?)
- Omni (1978–1998)
- On, Time Inc. (1996–2001)
- One, One Media (2001)
- OP Magazine (1979–1984)
- Operations Magazine (1991–2010)
- Option (1985–1998)
- Orbit Science Fiction (1953–1954)
- Origin (1951–ca.2004)
- Orion (1842–1844)
- Other Worlds (1949–1958)
- Others: A Magazine of the New Verse (1915–1919)
- Oui (1964–2007)
- Out of This World Adventures (1950)
- Outdoor Explorer, Time4 Media Inc. (1999–2001)
- The Outlook (1870–1935)
- Overland Monthly (1868–1935)
- OverRev (2004–2006)
- Oz-story Magazine (1995–2000)

== P ==
- Pacific Magazine (1976–2008)
- The Pacific Monthly (1898–1911)
- Pacific RailNews (1961–1999)
- Pageant (1944–1977)
- Panzerfaust Magazine (1967–1976)
- Paradox (2003–2009)
- Parenting (1987-2013)
- Parents (1926-2022)
- Partisan Review (1934–2003)
- PC Direct, VNU Business Publications ( –2001)
- PC Life (1986–1988)
- PC Magazine (1982–2009)
- PC/Computing ( –2002)
- Peanut Butter, Scholastic (19??–19??)
- Pennsylvania Sportsman, PRIMEDIA (1959–2001)
- People Today (1950–?)
- Petersen's 4-Wheel & Off-Road (1977–2019)
- Peterson's Magazine (1842–1898)
- Photoplay (1911–1980)
- Pilates Style
- PiQ (2008)
- Pizzazz, Marvel Comics (1977–1979)
- Planet Stories (1939–1955)
- Playboy (1953–2020)
- Playgirl (1973–2016)
- PlayStation: The Official Magazine (1997-2012)
- The Pleasure Boat (1845–1862)
- Pocket Magazine (1895–?)
- Pojos Pokémon, H&S Media Inc. (1999–2001)
- Politics (1944–1949)
- Polyanthos (1805–1814)
- Popular Electronics (1954–1999)
- The Popular Magazine (1903–1931)
- Portfolio: An Intercontinental Quarterly (1945–1947)
- Portfolio Magazine (1979–1983)
- The Portico (1816–1818)
- Practical Anarchy (1991–2007)
- Premiere (1987–2007)
- The Print Collector's Quarterly (1911–1950)
- Pro Football Weekly (1967–2013)
- Preschool Playroom Magazine (2002–2006)
- Psychoanalysis (1955)
- Psychotronic Video (1989–2006)
- Putnam's Magazine (1853–1910)

== Q ==
- Quark (1970–?)
- The Quarterly (1987–1995)
- Quick & Easy Crafts, H&S Media Inc. ( –2001)

== R ==
- Radiance, Radiance (1984–2001)
- Radical America (1967–1999)
- Radical Society (2002–ca.2006)
- Radio-Electronics (1929–2003)
- Railroad Man's Magazine (1906–1979)
- The Rainbow (1981–1993)
- Ramparts (1962–1975)
- Ray Gun (1992–2000)
- Rays from the Rose Cross (1913-2004)
- ReadyMade (2001-2011)
- The Reaper (1980–1989)
- Red Herring (1993–2007)
- RedEye (2002-2020)
- Reedy's Mirror (1891–1994)
- Relief Society Magazine (1915–1970)
- The Reporter (1949–1968)
- Review of Reviews (1892–1937)
- Revolution (Brisbane), Imagine Media (2000–2001)
- The Rip Off Review of Western Culture (1972)
- Road to Freedom (1927–1931)
- Royal American Magazine (1774–1775)
- RUN (1984–1992)

== S ==
- Sackbut Review (1978–1981)
- Sacramento Magazine (1975-2023)
- St. Nicholas Magazine (1873–1943)
- Samizdat (1998–2004)
- San Francisco Review of Books (1975–1997)
- Sassy (1988–1996)
- Satellite Direct (1994–2025)
- Satellite Science Fiction (1956–1959)
- Saturday Review (1920–1984)
- Saturn (1957–1958)
- Scanlan's Monthly (1970–1971)
- Schwing!, High Speed Productions Inc. (1999–2001)
- Sci Fiction (2000–2005)
- Science (1979–1986)
- Science & Spirit (1989–2009)
- Science Digest (1937–1986)
- Science Fiction Age (1992–2000)
- Science Fiction Forum (1957–?)
- Science-Fiction Plus (1952–1953)
- Scientific American Mind (2004-2017)
- Scooby-Doo Scooby Snacks, H&S Media Inc. ( –2001)
- Scope, Scholastic (19??–19??)
- Scribner's Magazine (1887–1939)
- Scribner's Monthly (1870–1881)
- Script (1929–1949)
- Scrye (1994–2009)
- Secret Agent X (1934–1939)
- See (1941–unknown)
- Seed (2001-2012)
- Sega Visions (1990–1995)
- Self (1979–2017; continues online)
- Senior Golfer, Time Inc. (1992–2001)
- Sesame Street Magazine, Sesame Workshop (1970–2008; continues online)
- Sesame Street Parents, Sesame Workshop (1981–2001)
- The Seven Arts (1916–1917)
- Shock Illustrated (1955–1956)
- Shonen Jump (2002–2012)
- Short Stories (1890–1959)
- Showmen's Trade Review (1933–1957)
- Shyflowers Garden Library, Shyflowers Enterprises Ltd. (2001)
- Sick (1960–1980)
- Silicon Alley Reporter, Rising Tide Studios (1998–2001)
- Simpsons Illustrated (1991–1993)
- Sinsemilla Tips (1980–1990)
- Situationist Antinational (1974)
- The Sky (1935–1941)
- Smart Partner, Ziff-Davis Media (1998–2001)
- The Smart Set (1900–1930)
- Smile (1998-2002)
- Soap Opera Magazine ( –1999)
- Soap Opera Update (1992–2002)
- Socialist Review (1970–2002)
- SoftSide, SoftSide Publications (1978–1984)
- Southern California New Homes, PRIMEDIA Haas Publishing Co. ( –2001)
- Southern Literary Journal and Monthly Magazine (1835–1837)
- Southern Literary Messenger (1834–1864)
- Space Science Fiction (1952–1953)
- Space Science Fiction Magazine (1957)
- Space Stories (1952–1953)
- Speak, Speak (1995–2001)
- Spicy Detective (1934–1947)
- SPORT (1946–2000, 2007)
- Sport Compact Car (1988–2009)
- Sporting News (1886–2012)
- Sports Illustrated (1948–1949) published by Dell
- Sports Illustrated for Women (1999–2002)
- Sprint, Scholastic (197?–19??)
- Spy (1986–1998)
- Star Trek: The Magazine (1999-2003)
- STart (1986–1991)
- The Stormtrooper Magazine (1964–1968)
- Startling Stories (1939–1955)
- Stirring Science Stories (1941–1942)
- Storm Track (1977–2002)
- Strange Stories (1939–1941)
- Strange Tales (1931–1933)
- Streaming Media, Penton Media ( –2001)
- Success, Success Holdings Co. LLC (1895–1999; 2000–2001)
- Sulfur (1981–2000)
- Sunshine (1924–1963)
- SuperMag (1976–198?)
- Super-Science Fiction (1956–1959)
- Super Science Stories (1940–1943; 1949–1951)
- Super Stock and Drag Illustrated (1960–1996)
- Swing, David Lauren (publisher), (ca.1995–ca.1999)
- Symra (1905–1914)
- The Syrian World (1926–1932)

== T ==
- T3, Imagine Media Inc. (2000–2001)
- Tales of Magic and Mystery (1927–1928)
- Talk (1999–2001)
- Teen, Hearst Corporation (1954–2009)
- Teen Beat (1967-c.2007)
- Teen Girl Power, Starlog Group Inc. (1998–2001)
- Teen People, Time Inc (1998–2003)
- Teen Voices (1988-2013)
- TeenSet (1964-1969)
- Tele.com, CMP Media (1996–2001)
- Ten Story Fantasy (1951)
- Terror Illustrated (1955–1956)
- TheaterWeek (1987–?1997
- This (1971–1982)
- This Week (1935–1969)
- The Thrill Book (1919)
- Thrilling Adventures (1931–1943)
- Tiger Beat (1965-2019)
- Tikkun (1986-2024)
- To-Morrow (1903–1909)
- Today's Homeowner, Time Inc. (1928–2001)
- The Token and Atlantic Souvenir (1826–1842)
- Tomorrow (1942–1962)
- Tomorrow Speculative Fiction (1993–2000)
- Toosquare Magazine (2001–?)
- Top-Notch Magazine (1910–1937)
- Tops in Science Fiction (1953)
- Total Movie, Imagine Media Inc. (2000–2001)
- ToyFare (1997–2011)
- Transatlantic Review (1959–1977)
- Transition (1927–1938)
- Transsexual News Telegraph (1991–2002)
- Travel + Leisure Golf (1998–2009)
- Travel Holiday (1901–2003)
- Travelocity, AA Magazine Publications (2000–2001)
- Treasure Chest of Fun and Facts (1946–1972)
- Triumph (1966–1975)
- The Tropical Sun (1891–1930s)
- Trouser Press (1974–1984)
- Truckin' Magazine (1975–2020)
- True (1937–1975)
- True Tunes News (1989–1998)
- Trump (1957)
- Truth (1881–1905)
- Tryout (1914–1946)
- The Twilight Zone Magazine (1981–1989)
- Twist (1997-2016)
- Two Complete Science-Adventure Books (1950–1954)
- TWX (1944–1952)

== U ==
- U.S. Air Services (1919–1956)
- U.S. Lady (1955–?)
- U.S. News & World Report (1933–2010)
- Uncanny Stories (1941)
- Uncanny Tales (1939–1940)
- The United States Magazine and Democratic Review (1837–1859)
- University Business, (1998–2001)
- UNIX Review ( –2007)
- UnixWorld (1984–1995)
- Unknown (1939–1943)
- Upside (1989–2002)
- UpTime (1984–?)

== V ==
- Valiente, Valiente Ltd. (2000–2001)
- Valleykids Parent News, (1991–2001)
- Vanguard (1932–1939)
- Venture Science Fiction (1957–1958; 1969–1970)
- Verbatim (1974–?)
- Vermont Life (1946-2018)
- Vice Versa (1947–1948)
- Video, Reese Communications Inc. (1978–1986)
- Video Game Review, H&S Media Inc. ( –2001)
- Video Games (1982–1984)
- VideoGames & Computer Entertainment (1988–1996)
- Video Review (1980–1991)
- Viva (1973–1980)
- Voice, Scholastic (1946–19??)
- The Voice of the Negro (1904–1907)

== W ==
- Walking, Reader's Digest (1986–2001)
- The Wargamer (1977–1990)
- Warman's Today's Collector, Krause Publications Inc. (1993–2001)
- The Wasp (1876–1941)
- Waymark, Angel Enterprises (1991)
- Weird Worlds, Scholastic (1979–1981)
- West Shore (1875–1891)
- Western Story Magazine (1919–1949)
- Wet (1976–1981)
- WHIRL Magazine, WHIRL Publishing (2001–2019)
- Whispers ( –ca.1984)
- Whitetail Business, Krause Publications Inc. (1997–2001)
- Whole Earth Review (1985–2003)
- Whole Earth Software Catalog and Review (1984–1985)
- Whole Living (2010–2013)
- Wigwag (1988–1991)
- Wild Cartoon Kingdom (1993–1994)
- Windows Magazine (1990–1999)
- Windows Sources (ca.1993–ca.2001)
- Wizard (1991–2011)
- Woman's Home Companion (1873–1957)
- Woman's Journal, IPC Media Inc. (1927–2001)
- WomenSports (1974–2000)
- Wonder Stories (1929–1955)
- Working Woman, Working Woman Network (1972–2001)
- Worlds Beyond (1950–1951)
- Worlds of Tomorrow (1963–1967; 1970–1971)
- The World's Work (1900–1932)
- Wormwood Review (1959–1999)
- Wow, Scholastic (1977–19??)
- WOW Magazine, H&S Media Inc./Kappa Publishing Group ( –2001)
- Writers' Journal (1980-20??)

== X–Z ==
- XRay Magazine (2000–2004)
- Yahoo! Internet Life ( –2002)
- Yank, the Army Weekly (1942–1945)
- Yellow Silk (1981–1996)
- YGA (2004-2006)
- YM (1932–2004)
- Young Wings (1929–1955)
- Young Woman's Journal (1889–1929)
- Your Garden, IPC Media Inc. (1992–2001)
- Your Life, IPC Media Inc. (2001)
- Your Money, Consumers Digest Media (1979–2001)
- The Youth's Companion (1827–1929)
- Zygote in My Coffee (2003-2014)

== See also ==
- List of United States magazines
- Media of the United States
