= Nogging =

Nogging, an architectural term, may refer to:

- Brick nog (nogged, nogging), term used for the filling in-between wall framing in buildings
- Nogging or dwang, a horizontal bracing piece used to give rigidity

== See also ==
- Noggin (disambiguation)
