= Takano =

Takano (written: 高野) is a Japanese surname. Notable people with the surname include:

- Ai Takano, Japanese singer
- Aya Takano, Japanese artist and writer
- Aya Takano (swimmer), Japanese athlete
- Takano Chōei, scholar of the late Edo period
- Takano Fusataro, Japanese labor activist
- Genshin Takano, Governor of Hiroshima Prefecture from June 10 to October 11, 1945.
- George Takano, professional wrestler
- Hajime Takano, Japanese journalist
- Hassei Takano, Japanese actor
- Hideyuki Takano (髙野 秀行, born 1972), Japanese shogi player
- Hiroshi Takano, Japanese musician
- Isoroku Takano, birth name of Isoroku Yamamoto, Japanese naval officer
- Takano Iwasaburo, Japanese social statistician
- Kazuaki Takano, Japanese writer of crime fiction
- Kikuo Takano, Japanese poet and mathematician
- Mari Takano, Japanese musician
- Mark Takano, U.S. politician
- Takano no Niigasa, 8th-century concubine
- Satoshi Takano (高野 智史, born 1993), Japanese shogi player
- Shiho Takano, Japanese actress
- Shunji Takano, Japanese wrestler
- Susumu Takano, Japanese track athlete
- Teppei Takano, Japanese ski jumper
- Tetsu Takano, Japanese rock musician
- Tomomi Takano (高野 人母美, born 1987), Japanese model and boxer
- Toshiyuki Takano, Japanese diplomat
- Tsugi Takano, Japanese novelist
- Urara Takano, Japanese voice actress
- Yoshiko Takano (鷹野 淑子, born 1942), Japanese speed skater
- Yasuko Takano (鷹野 靖子, born 1943), Japanese speed skater

== Fictional characters ==
- Bungo Takano, a character in Shadow Star
- Kyohei Takano, a character in The Wallflower
- Miyo Takano, a character in Higurashi no Naku Koro ni

== See also ==
- Japanese name
- Special:Prefixindex/Takano – the page gives articles starting with Takano
