= Life (humor magazine) =

American magazine (1883–1936)

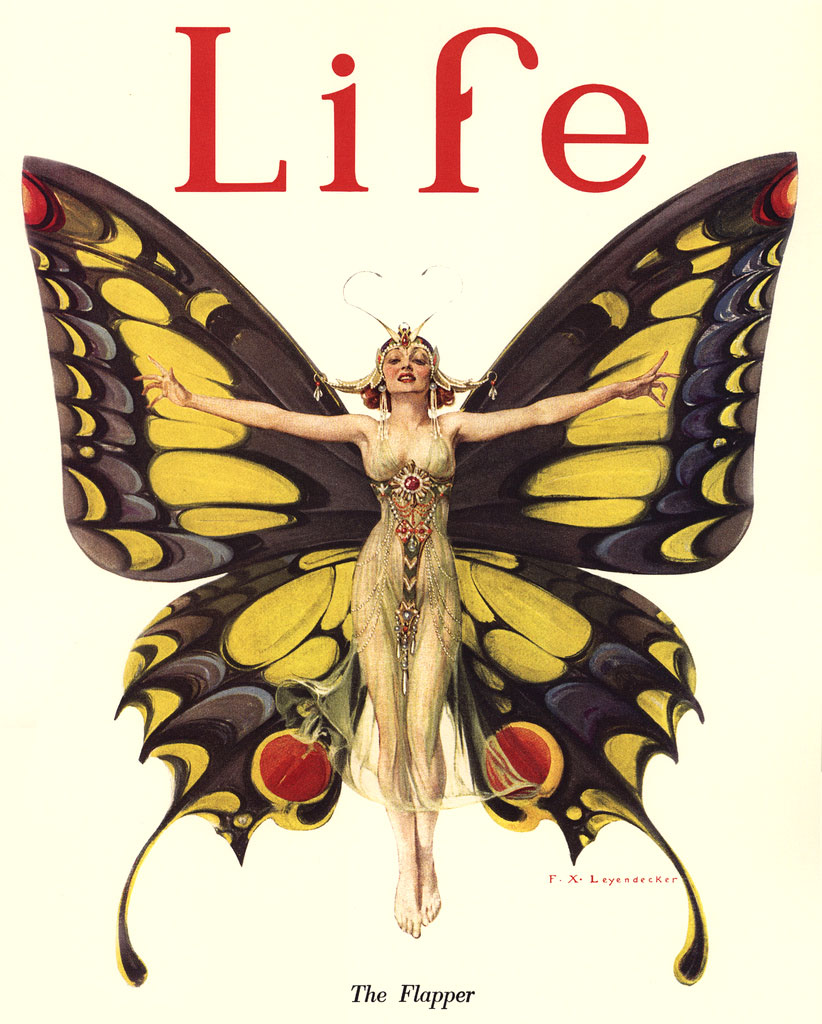
- Cover of the issue from February 2, 1922
- Categories: Humor, general interest
- Frequency: Monthly
- First issue: January 4, 1883; 143 years ago
- Final issue: November 1936
- Country: United States
- Based in: New York City, U.S.
- Language: English

Life was an American humor and general-interest magazine launched in 1883. Published initially as a weekly, and transitioning to monthly during the Great Depression, it featured contributions from prominent illustrators and cartoonists such as Charles Dana Gibson and Norman Rockwell.

The magazine was purchased and shut down in 1936 by Henry Luce and replaced by a new magazine also called Life, launched as the first all-photographic American news magazine.

== Editors ==
Editor	Start year	End year	Ref.
Edward Sandford Martin	1883	1883	
Robert E. Sherwood	1924	1928	
Norman Anthony	1928	1929	
George Cary Eggleston		1936	

== History ==
=== 19th century ===
Life was founded on January 4, 1883, in New York City as a partnership between John Ames Mitchell and Andrew Miller. Mitchell held 75% interest in the magazine, and Miller held the remaining 25%. (Edward Sandford Martin also first held shares but sold them after he left his position as editor) Miller served as secretary-treasurer and managed the business side of the magazine. Mitchell invested his $10,000 inheritance in the magazine and served as the publisher.

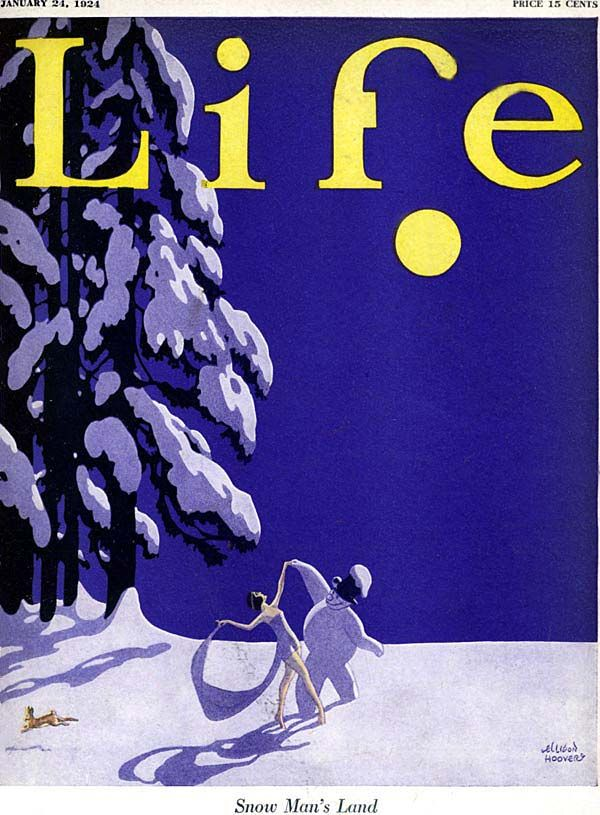
Cover of the issue from January 24, 1924

Under the leadership of Miller, the magazine took advantage of a new printing process using zinc-coated plates, which improved the reproduction of illustrations and artwork. This gave Life an advantage in a market that had tough competition from already-successful magazines Judge and Puck. Edward Sandford was brought on as the first editor (as literary editor).

The motto of the first issue was: "While there's Life, there's hope." The new magazine set forth its principles and policies to its readers:

We wish to have some fun in this paper...We shall try to domesticate as much as possible of the casual cheerfulness that is drifting about in an unfriendly world...We shall have something to say about religion, about politics, fashion, society, literature, the stage, the stock exchange, and the police station, and we will speak out what is in our mind as fairly, as truthfully, and as decently as we know how.

The magazine was a success and soon became one of the leading satirical publications attracting contributors like Charles Dana Gibson. Three years after the magazine was founded, the Massachusetts native first sold Life a drawing for $4: a dog outside his kennel howling at the Moon. Encouraged by a publisher, also an artist, Gibson was joined at Life by illustrators Palmer Cox, A. B. Frost, Oliver Herford, and E. W. Kemble. Life's literary roster included John Kendrick Bangs, James Whitcomb Riley, and Brander Matthews.

=== 20th century ===
Entering into the 20th century James Ames Mitchell was accused of anti-Semitism, at a time of high rates of immigration of Eastern European Jews to New York. Life had published caricatures of Jews with large noses.

When the magazine blamed the theatrical team of Klaw & Erlanger for Chicago's Iroquois Theater Fire in 1903, many people complained. Life's drama critic, James Stetson Metcalfe, was barred from the 47 Manhattan theatres controlled by the Theatrical Syndicate.

Several individuals would publish their first major works in Life. In 1908, Robert Ripley published his first cartoon in Life, 20 years before his Believe It or Not! fame. Norman Rockwell's first cover for Life magazine, Tain't You, was published on May 10, 1917. His paintings were featured on Life's cover 28 times between 1917 and 1924. Rea Irvin, the first art director of The New Yorker and creator of the character "Eustace Tilley", began his career by drawing covers for Life.

After Germany attacked Belgium in 1914, Mitchell and Gibson undertook a campaign to push the U.S. into the war. Gibson drew the Kaiser as a bloody madman, insulting Uncle Sam, sneering at crippled soldiers, and shooting Red Cross nurses.

Following Mitchell's death in 1918, Charles Dana Gibson purchased the magazine for $1 million in 1920 ($16.1 million in 2025). A little more than three years after purchasing Life, Gibson quit and turned the property over to publisher Clair Maxwell and treasurer Henry Richter. In 1920, Gibson had selected former Vanity Fair staffer Robert E. Sherwood as associate editor. Sherwood, a World War I veteran and member of the Algonquin Round Table, tried to inject sophisticated humor onto the pages. Life published Ivy League jokes, cartoons, flapper sayings and all-burlesque issues.

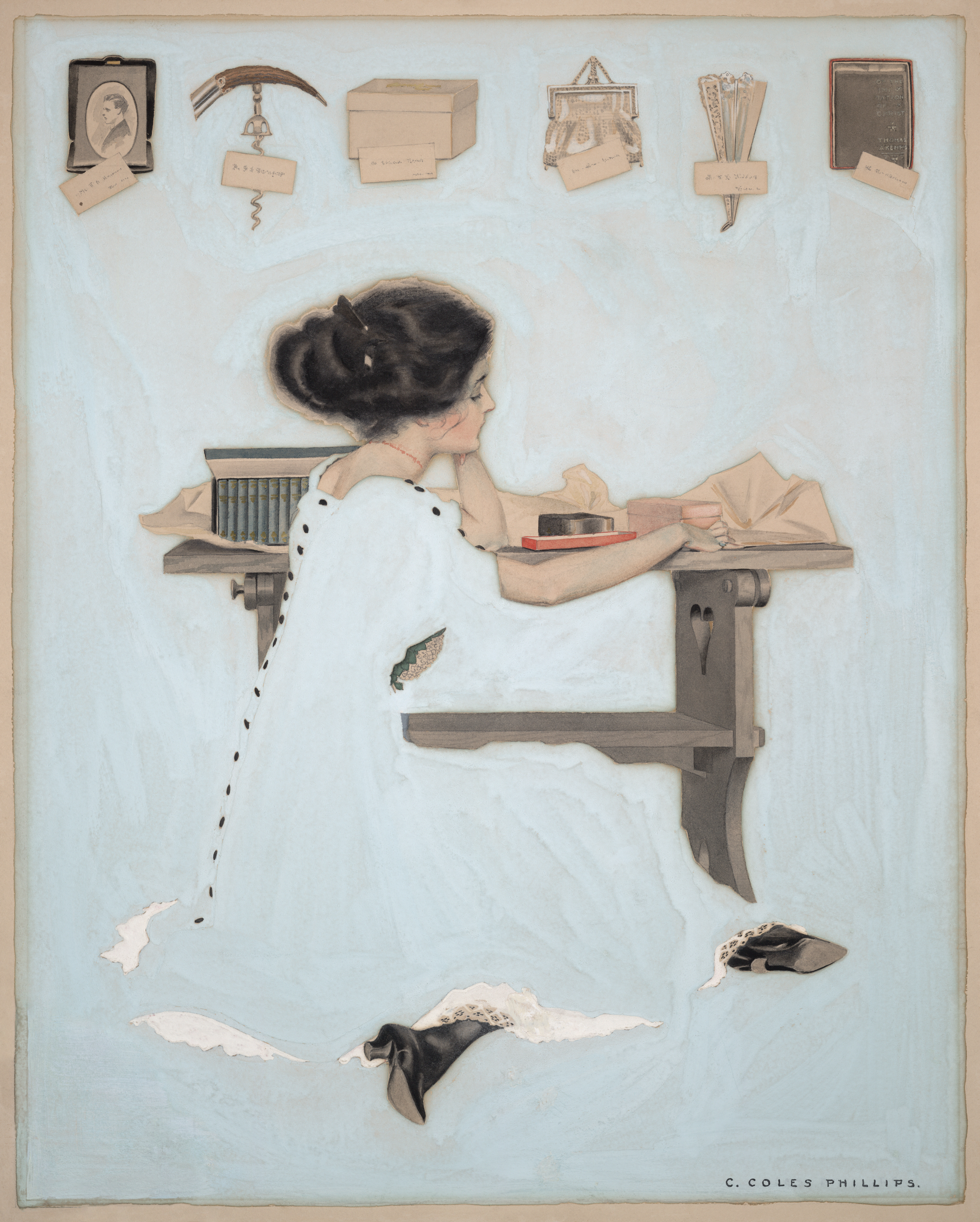
Cover by Coles Phillips of the issue from January 27, 1910

Beginning in 1920, it undertook a crusade against Prohibition. It also tapped the humorous writings of Frank Sullivan, Robert Benchley, Dorothy Parker, Franklin Pierce Adams and Corey Ford. Among the illustrators and cartoonists were Ralph Barton, Percy Crosby, Don Herold, Ellison Hoover, H. T. Webster, Art Young, and John Held, Jr.

Life had 250,000 readers in 1920, but as the Jazz Age rolled into the Great Depression, the magazine lost money and subscribers. By the time editor George Eggleston took over, Life had switched from publishing weekly to monthly. Maxwell and Eggleston went to work revamping its editorial style to meet the times, which resulted in improved readership. However, Life had passed its prime and was sliding toward financial ruin. The New Yorker, debuting in February 1925, copied many of the features and styles of Life, and recruited staff from that magazine's editorial and art departments. Another blow to Life's circulation came from raunchy humor periodicals such as Ballyhoo (founded by former editor Norman Anthony) and Hooey, which ran what can be termed "outhouse" gags. In 1933, Esquire joined Life's competitors. In its final years, Life struggled to make a profit.

Announcing the end of Life, Maxwell stated: "We cannot claim, like Mr. Gene Tunney, that we resigned our championship undefeated in our prime. But at least we hope to retire gracefully from a world still friendly."

For Life's final issue in its original format, then-80-year-old Edward Sandford Martin was recalled from editorial retirement to compose its obituary. He wrote:

That Life should be passing into the hands of new owners and directors is of the liveliest interest to the sole survivor of the little group that saw it born in January 1883 ... As for me, I wish it all good fortune; grace, mercy and peace and usefulness to a distracted world that does not know which way to turn nor what will happen to it next. A wonderful time for a new voice to make a noise that needs to be heard!

Henry Luce purchased the magazine on November 23, 1936 to launch a pictorial-news magazine also called Life, (later published by Time Inc.).

== Contributors ==
Notable contributors included:

- John Kendrick Bangs, editor and writer
- Dominic Behan, writer
- Charles Dana Gibson, illustrator
- Lejaren Hiller, Sr., illustrator
- Norman Rockwell, illustrator

== See also ==
- List of defunct American periodicals
