= Design Your Own Railroad =

1990 video game

- Developer: Abracadata
- Publisher: Abracadata
- Platforms: Apple II, Classic Mac OS, MS-DOS
- Release: 1990: Apple II; 1992: Mac, MS-DOS

Design Your Own Railroad is a video game published in 1990 for the Apple II by Abracadata. Versions were later released for Classic Mac OS and MS-DOS

== Gameplay ==
Design Your Own Railroad is a game in which a railroad hobbyist can build a model railroad and run simulations.

== Development ==
The game was developed by Abracadata, a company based in Eugene, Oregon. Dill Software wrote the game for IBM compatible computers.

== Reception ==
Reception

Review score
Publication	Score
InCider	3.5/5

Russell Sipe reviewed the game for Computer Gaming World, and stated that "In summary, if you are a model railroader/rail fan you will find this product a very enjoyable extension of your chosen hobby (but be sure to get version 1.2 or later). Non-railroaders (even if they enjoyed Railroad Tycoon) will either find themselves drawn into the world of model railroading by DYORR, or find themselves bored stiff. As for me, I love it."
