= Gunton =

Gunton may refer to:

== Places ==
- Gunton, Manitoba, Canada
- St Andrew's Church, Gunton, a redundant church near Gunton Hall, Norfolk
- Gunton railway station in Thorpe Market, Norfolk
- Gunton, Suffolk, England
- Gunton Hall, Norfolk

== Other uses ==
- Gunton (surname)
