= Night sky (disambiguation) =

The night sky refers to the sky as it is seen at night.

Night sky (or skies) may also refer to:

- Night Sky (TV series), a 2022 science-fiction TV series on Amazon Prime Video
- Night Skies, a 1970s sci-fi horror film conceived by Steven Spielberg
- Night Skies (2007 film), a 2007 horror film that revolves around the Phoenix Lights
- Night Sky (magazine), a 2004-2007 American magazine for entry-level stargazers published by Sky Publishing
- Night Sky Mine, a 1997 science fiction novel by Melissa Scott
- Night Sky Network, an educational effort sponsored by the National Aeronautics and Space Administration (NASA)
- Night Sky Replies, a 1994 mini album by the American musician Robert Rich
- Night Sky (play), a 1991 play by Susan Yankowitz
- "Nightsky", a 2023 song by Kamelot from The Awakening
- NightSky, a 2011 video game

== See also ==
- Sky at Night (disambiguation)
- Darkest Night (disambiguation)
- Longest Night (disambiguation)
- Night (disambiguation)
- Nights (disambiguation)
- Planetarium
- Sky (disambiguation)
