= Charlene Rink =

American bodybuilder and wrestler

- Professional bodybuilder

Personal info
- Born: February 11, 1972 (age 54); Garden Grove, California, U.S.

Best statistics
- Height: 5 ft 6 in (1.68 m)
- Weight: (In Season) 126-135 lb (Off-Season) 136-140 lb

Professional (Pro) career
- Pro-debut: NPC Fitness USA; 1999
- Best win: NPC Fitness USA (1st); 1999
- Active: Retired 2000

Charlene Rink (born February 11, 1972) is a former professional fitness competitor, wrestler and competitive female bodybuilder. In 1999, she won first place in the Fitness tall class at the National Physique Committee Fitness USA Championships.

== Personal background ==
Charlene Rink, (née Virginia Charlene Thompson) was born on February 11, 1972, in Garden Grove, California. She was married August 21, 1993, at The Little White Wedding Chapel in Las Vegas, Nevada. She has one daughter, Zara Olivia Rink, born September 20, 2004.

Rink attended Arizona Western College on a cheerleading scholarship. She received her Bachelor of Science degree in foods and nutrition from San Diego State University, and has earned vocational certifications as an emergency medical technician, fitness Instructor, and aerobics instructor. Rink is a member of the American Dietetic Association and the Institute of Food Technologists.

On September 24, 2010, Jeffrey Marr honored Rink for her dedication to the health and wellness of others by setting honorary bookplates on six biomedicine volumes at the UCLA Library.

== Competitive background ==
Rink competed in both fitness and bodybuilding across multiple sanctions in the industry. She entered her first fitness competition at the Wally Boyko Productions (NFSB) 1994 Ms. Fitness San Diego competition and placed first. She then competed in the Fitness Universe sanction to achieve the title of Ms. Internationally Fit. In 1996 Rink competed in her first competitive bodybuilding competition, taking the woman's open bodybuilding at the National Physique Committee (NPC) Paradise Cup and becoming a permanent member of the Paradise Cup Hall of Fame. In 1999, Rink won the Fitness tall class at the National Physique Committee (NPC) Fitness USA Championships and earned the status of International Federation of BodyBuilding & Fitness (IFBB) Professional.

== Wrestling ==
Rink competed successfully as a submission style wrestler for several female wrestling video organisations including Premier production and Utopia entertainment. She wrestled both women and men, her matches including a victory over fellow IFBB competitor Pavla Brantalova from the Czech Republic. and defeating rival fitness model Karen Konyha

== Tournaments ==
1994

- 1994 NFSB Ms. Fitness San Diego, 1st
- 1994 NFSB Ms. Fitness Arizona, 2nd
- 1994 NFSB Ms. Fitness Inland Empire, 1st
- 1994 NFSB Ms. Fitness Western, 1st

1995

- 1995 NFSB Ms. Fitness Western, 2nd
- 1995 Fitness America Pageant ESPN2 Series, 2nd

1996

- 1996 NPC Paradise Cup, 1st
- 1996 Fitness Universe Ms. Internationally Fit, 1st
- 1996 Fitness America Pageant National Championships, 9th

1997

- 1997 NPC Fitness USA, 6th
- 1997 NPC Fitness West Coast Jubilee, 2nd
- 1997 NPC Fitness Nationals, 15th

1998

- 1998 NPC Fitness California, 1st
- 1998 NPC Fitness USA, 3rd

1999

- 1999 NPC Fitness USA, 1st

2000

- 2000 IFBB Atlantic City Pro, 12th

== Media and press ==
- "Fun and Sun" Muscle Mag International 2000, November, issue 221, pg. 156
- "Fitness Perspective" NutriMag 2000, issue 6, pg. 30
- "Hot Shots" Iron Man Magazine 2000, October pg. 60–62
- "Triple Triumph" Oxygen Women's Fitness Magazine 2000, March/April pg. 174
- "Westside Story" Iron Man Magazine 1999, December pg. 175-184, 200
- "Miss Fitness" IN Magazine, March 1995

Modeling background

- Alpha Sport BodyCraft software & supplement, 1995-96
- SunSkinz swimwear, San Diego, California, August–December 1995
- Glyn Jones Productions digital design & photography, 1994–95
