= Zygote (disambiguation) =

A zygote is a fertilized biological cell.

Zygote may also refer to:

- Zygote (album), the first solo album from John Popper
- Zygote (software), a software component of the Android operating system
- Zygote in My Coffee, an underground magazine in the United States published 2003–2010
- Zygote (2017), a short SF/horror movie created by Oats Studios
