= Gunion =

Gunion is a surname. Notable people with the surname include:

- John F. Gunion (born 1943), American physicist
- John Gunion Rutherford (1857–1923), Canadian veterinarian, civil servant, and politician
- William Gunion Rutherford (1853–1907), Scottish scholar

== See also ==
- Gunton (surname)
