= Noggin =

Noggin may refer to:

== General ==
- Noggin or gill (unit), a unit of volume
- Noggin (cup), a small cup
- Noggin, slang for head
- Noggin (protein), a signalling molecule involved in embryonic development
- Noggin or dwang, a carpentry term

== Entertainment ==
- Noggin (brand), an entertainment brand, currently a streaming service.
- Noggin the Nog, a BBC children's character and TV series (1959-1965), and a series of children's books
- Noggin (magazine), an American magazine that published art, fiction, cartoons, plus social and political commentary
- Noggin, a Monster in My Singing Monsters
