= Pavla Brantalova =

Czech bodybuilder

Pavla Brantalova (born 1977 in Czech Republic) is a female bodybuilder and session wrestler. She achieved acclaim in bodybuilding circles by competing successfully at the international level from 1990 to 2000. Brantalova won the lightweight division at the European Bodybuilding Championship in 1998. She placed third in the lightweight division at the 1998 IFBB World Amateur Bodybuilding Championships and second in the lightweight division at the 1999 Jan Tana Classic. She also placed 7th in the IFBB World Amateur Bodybuilding Championships in 2000. She competed at a weight ranging from 115 to 125 pounds at a height of 5'3" and was known for a physique that was particularly well-developed for someone of her age, as she was in her twenties. At a weight of 125 pounds, Brantalova was able to bench press 180 pounds for eight repetitions.

In addition to bodybuilding, Brantalova has used her muscular physique and strength to pursue a career in submission style wrestling in which she wrestled against female and even male opponents. She was a small but surprisingly strong wrestler. She has made several bodybuilding videos. She is known for taking on fellow IFBB competitor Charlene Rink in a topless wrestling match that Pavla is spent and defeated by Rink. Pavla Brantalova has retired from both bodybuilding and wrestling, and now works as a nurse in California.
