= Harriet Brown =

American writer, magazine editor, and professor of magazine journalism

- Occupations: Writer, professor
- Years active: 1979-present
- Website: https://harriet-brown.squarespace.com/

Harriet Brown is an American writer, magazine editor, and professor of magazine journalism at the S.I. Newhouse School of Public Communications at Syracuse University.

== Career ==
She began her magazine career in 1979, with a stint at Popular Science magazine. She was part of the start-up staff for both Wigwag magazine, 1989–1991, and American Girl magazine American Girl, 1992–2000. Her 2006 New York Times article "One Spoonful at a Time" chronicled the descent of her daughter, whom she does not want publicly named, into anorexia and recovery via family-based treatment, also known as the Maudsley approach. That article became the basis of her 2010 book, Brave Girl Eating. Her experiences inspired Brown to begin working as an advocate for better eating disorders treatment. That same year she helped found Maudsley Parents, a website offering resources to families struggling with anorexia.

As a professor at Newhouse, Brown continues to write, research, and teach about eating disorders and body image as well as other issues, including family estrangement. She writes for The New York Times science section and magazine, MIT Technology Review, O: The Oprah Magazine, Undark magazine, and many other publications. In 2011, she won the John F. Murray Prize in Strategic Communication for the Public Good, awarded by the University of Iowa School of Journalism. She currently lives in Syracuse, New York.

== Bibliography ==
=== Writer ===
- Shadow Daughter: A Memoir of Estrangement
- Body of Truth: How Science, History, and Culture Drive Our Obsession with Weight—and What We Can Do About It
- Brave Girl Eating: A Family's Struggle with Anorexia
- The Good-bye Window: A Year in the Life of a Day-Care Center

=== Editor ===
- Mr. Wrong: Real-Life Stories About the Men We Used to Love (Ballantine, 2007)
- Feed Me!: Writers Dish About Food, Eating, Body Image, and Weight (Ballantine, 2009)
