= 73 (magazine) =

Magazine about amateur radio

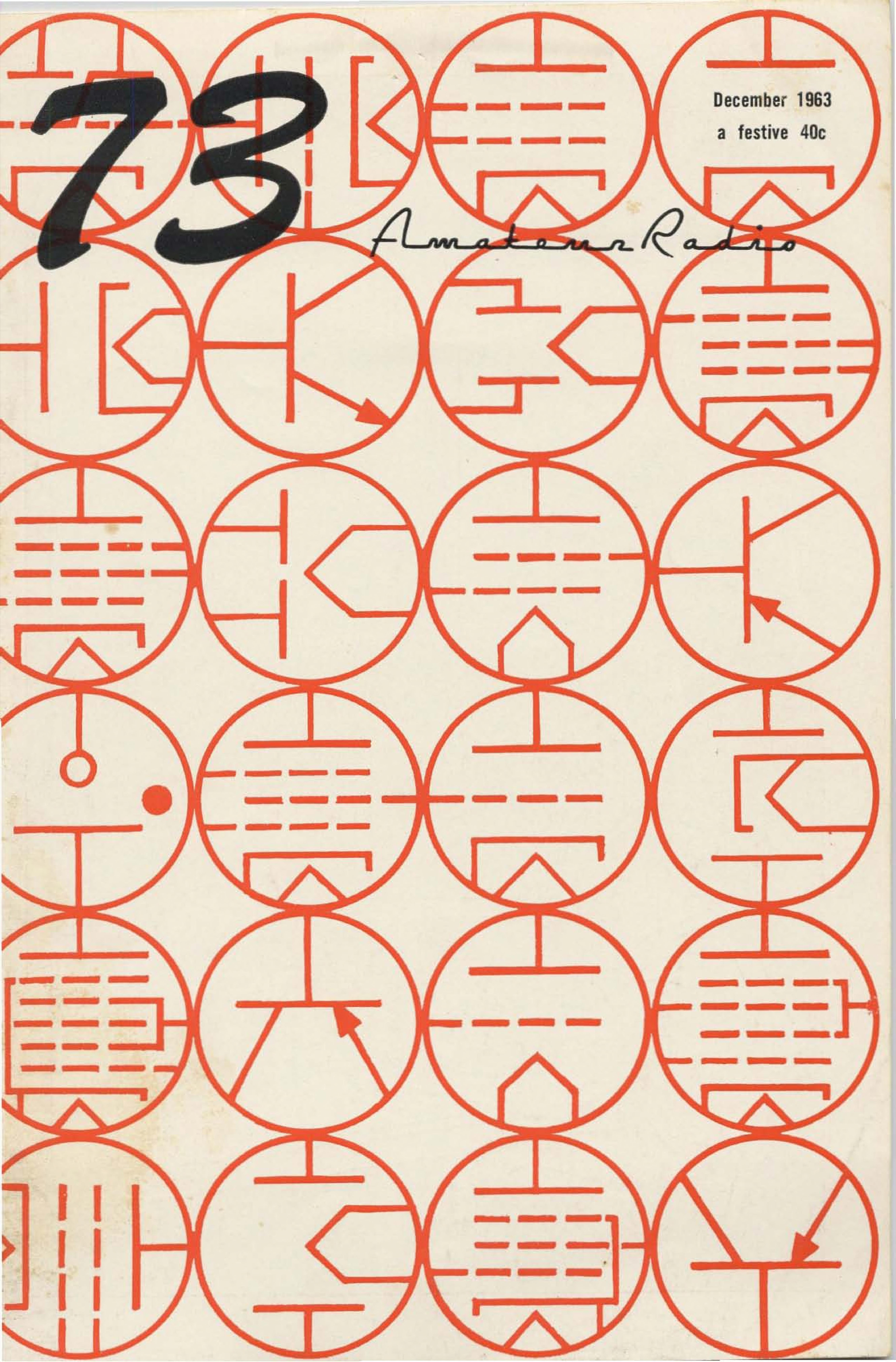
- Cover of the December 1963 issue
- Editor: Wayne Green
- Categories: Amateur radio
- Frequency: Monthly
- Founded: 1960
- First issue: October 1960
- Final issue Number: September 2003; Issue 514
- Company: Wayne Green Inc
- Country: United States
- Language: English
- ISSN: 1052-2522

73 Magazine (also known as 73 Amateur Radio Today) (OCLC 22239204) was a United States–based amateur radio magazine that was published from 1960 to 2003. It was known for its strong emphasis on technical articles and for the lengthy editorials in each issue by its founder and publisher, Wayne Green. The magazine title, 73, (Morse: −−••• •••−− ) means "best regards" in amateur radio lingo.

== History ==
The first issue of 73 was published in October 1960 from Green's business offices in Brooklyn, New York. A major contributing editor was Ken Sessions, K6MVH, who wrote a column called "The Chronicles of 76", a reference to the FM transmitting frequency of 146.76 megahertz. Sessions also authored many books on the subject of amateur radio, and designed many of the how-to projects included in the magazine.

Another contributing editor was Jean Shepherd, K2ORS.

According to the ARRL Letter, "73 was a pioneer promoter of SSB, FM, solid-state, easy construction projects, and the marriage of personal computing and amateur radio." 73 headquarters moved to Peterborough, New Hampshire in 1962. Average issues of 73 totaled more than 300 pages in the 1970s and 80s.

73 was known for its editorial column, "Never Say Die", in which, along with Sessions, Green often criticized the American Radio Relay League. The title "Never Say Die" was a backronym for Green's amateur radio call sign, W2NSD. Green later founded microcomputing magazines such as "Desktop Computing", Kilobaud Microcomputing, and 80 Micro, and was involved with the founding of Byte Magazine.

== Closing ==
After completing 43 years of publication, 73 Amateur Radio Today magazine ceased publication with the September 2003 issue (#514). A combined October/November 2003 issue was planned, but never appeared. Publisher Wayne Green cited financial pressure from reduced advertising revenue as the prime reason for shutting down publication of the magazine.
