= Christopher Null =

American film critic (born 1971)

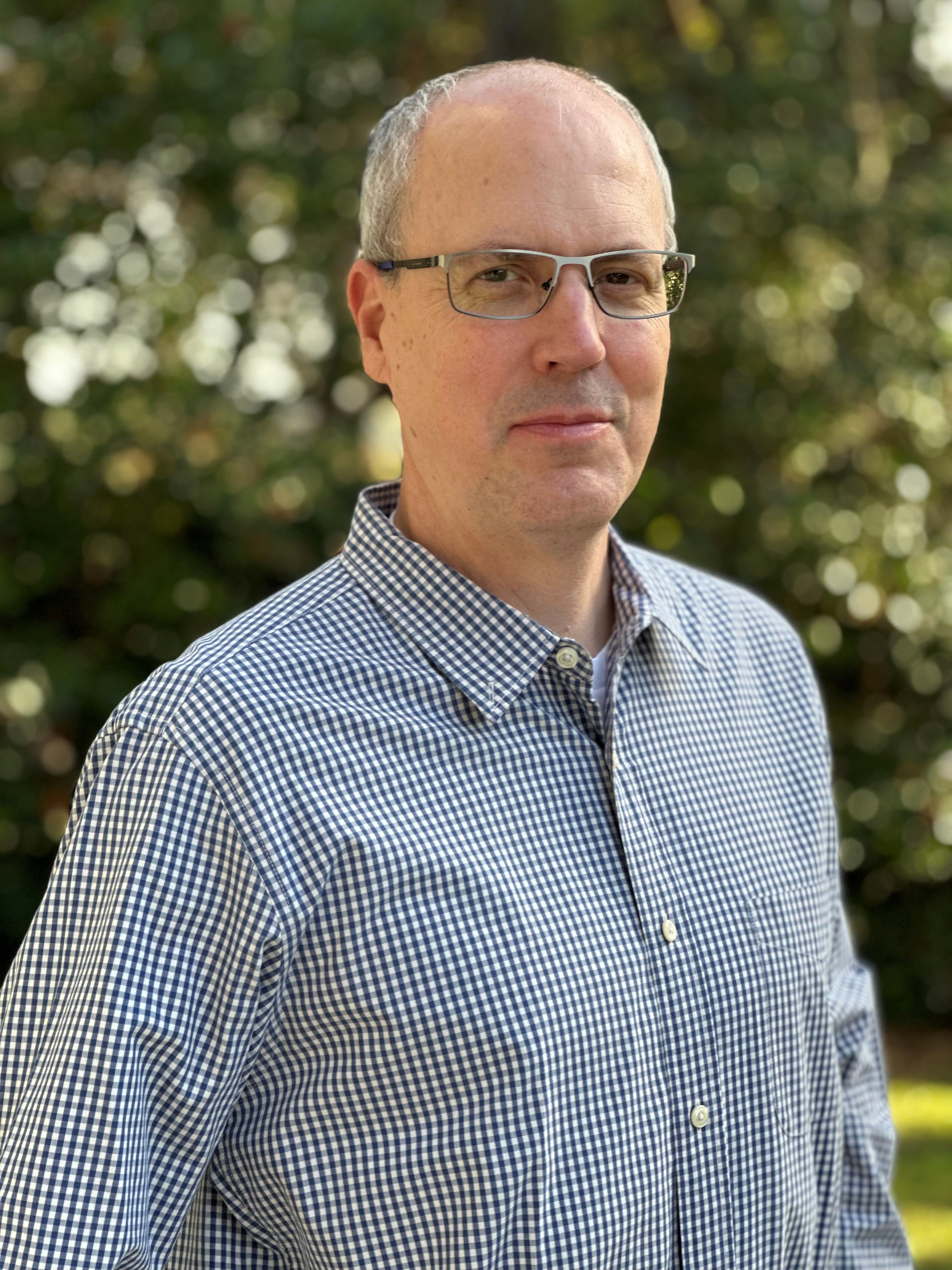
- Born: September 7, 1971 (age 55); Houston, Texas, U.S.
- Education: University of Texas at Austin (MBA)
- Occupations: Film critic, writer
- Spouses: Ashley Carder Null (m. 1998; div. 2010) Susanne Bergstrom-Null (m. 2012)
- Children: 2 (with Carder)

Christopher Null (born September 7, 1971) is an American writer, journalist and entrepreneur. A former blogger for Yahoo! Tech, he was the editor of Drinkhacker.com, and the founder and editor-in-chief of Filmcritic.com, which operated from 1995 to 2012. He is also the former magazine editor for PC/Computing and the founder of Mobile PC magazine.

== Early life ==
He was born on September 7, 1971, in Houston, Texas. He obtained an MBA at the University of Texas at Austin.

== Career ==
Null has built a career spanning technology journalism, film criticism, and online publishing. He began his editorial career in technology, serving as Managing Reviews Editor for LAN Times in the late 1990s before advancing to Smart Business (formerly PC Computing), where he held roles as Reviews Editor and Executive Editor from 1998 to 2002. Null then became Editor-in-Chief of New Architect magazine from 2002 to 2003 and led Mobile PC (later Mobile) magazine as Editor-in-Chief throughout its publication from 2003 to 2005. Additionally, he served as a technology columnist for American Express’s Executive Travel Magazine from 2008 to 2014.

From 2006 to 2010, Null was a member of the inaugural blogging team for Yahoo! Tech. He has also contributed to WIRED from the late 1990s onward, publishing hundreds of articles that cover topics ranging from laptops to hearing aids.

In the entrepreneurial space, Null founded Filmcritic.com in 1995, an online movie review platform where he personally authored over 4,000 reviews and served as Editor-in-Chief for the site’s other movie critics. The site was acquired by AMC in 2009, and Null continued working with AMC for three years before the site’s closure in 2012. He was also a founding member of the Online Film Critics Society.

In 2007, Null launched Drinkhacker, one of the longest-running spirits review websites, with more than 10,000 posts. In 2011, he established Null Media LLC, a boutique writing and editing company.

=== Writing ===
Null is also an accomplished author, having published four books, including two novels. He is also the author of two books: Five Stars! (2005, Sutro Press), a manual for aspiring film critics, and Half Mast (2002, Sutro Press), a novel.

In 2015, Null authored an article for Wired discussing the distinctive nature of his last name, which gained significant attention online. The article's popularity led to its feature as the focus of a Radiolab episode, as well as segments on Wait, Wait... Don’t Tell Me! and the British quiz show QI. Null continues to respond to media inquiries regarding the "Null" phenomenon highlighted in his article.

== Selected bibliography ==
- Null, Christopher (2025). The Cul-de-sac. Tule Publishing. p. 331. ISBN 9781965640234.
- Null, Christopher (2013). Five Stars! How to Become a Film Critic, the World's Greatest Job. Sutro Press. p. 258. ISBN 9780972098113.
- Null, Christopher (2002). Half mast (1st ed.). San Francisco: Sutro Press. ISBN 978-0-9720981-0-6.
- Parnell, Tere'; Null, Christopher (1999). Network administrator's reference. Network professional's library. Berkeley, Calif.: Osborne/McGraw-Hill. ISBN 978-0-07-882588-0.
