= Wigwag (magazine) =

Wigwag was an American magazine published from 1988 until 1991.

Founded by Alexander "Lex" Kaplen, who worked at The New Yorker, Wigwag eschewed celebrity coverage in favor of personal and literary writing. A test issue was put on newsstands in the summer of 1988, and the magazine formally debuted in October 1989. The magazine attracted writers such as Peter Matthiessen, Terry McMillan, Garry Wills, Alex Heard, Sousa Jamba and Nancy Franklin, but despite a circulation of 120,000, and despite being financially successful, ceased publication when the Gulf War broke out in 1991 and the economy entered a recession. It published its last issue in February 1991. In its brief lifetime it reached a circulation of close to 200,000 and became a brand name signifying family-feeling and an appreciation of the qualities of non-metropolitan America.

The legend of Wigwag's founding by a group of young exiles from The New Yorker – an exodus which followed The New Yorker's acquisition by Conde Nast and Conde Nast's subsequent dismissal of The New Yorker's longtime editor William Shawn – attracted an enormous amount of attention to its launch and early publication. Once launched, it quickly became a success d'estime, and critics often called it the "Anti-Spy" – in reference to the funny, cruel and cynical New York magazine of that name. Many saw the two magazines as rivals for media attention – neither survived the 1991 recession (although Spy lingered on in a brief afterlife). Contemporary observers thought that the "parent ship," The New Yorker itself, then edited by Robert Gottlieb, also saw itself as threatened by Wigwag during Wigwag's lifetime. Wigwag proposed a kind of counter-reality to the sophistication which magazines like The New Yorker and Spy aspired to – offering, instead of The New Yorker's famed "Talk of the Town" section, its own titled opening section, "Letters from Home."

Notable staffers at Wigwag include Nancy Holyoke, who went on (with the help of Harriet Brown, another Wigwag editor, now a professor at the S. I. Newhouse School of Public Communications) to found American Girl magazine at Pleasant Company in Wisconsin, Caroline Fraser, the author of a noted history of the Christian Science Church, and Evan Cornog, former dean of The Lawrence Herbert School of Communication at Hofstra University. One of the most significant contributors to Wigwag's identity was its art director, the illustrator and designer Paul Davis. Many have observed that Wigwag's editorial and design innovations under Kaplen and Davis were later adopted by Tina Brown and implemented at The New Yorker when she became its editor.

== See also ==
- List of defunct American magazines
