= Anne Ogborn =

American transgender rights activist

- Born: 1959 (age 66–67); Salina, Kansas
- Occupations: Transrights Activist and Software Engineer
- Known for: Founder of Kansas City Gender Society and Transgender Nation.
- Notable work: Coordinated Camp Trans and early participant and organizer of the New Women's Conference

Anne Ogborn (born 1959) is a transgender rights activist from Salina, Kansas. According to Patrick Califia she "should be credited as a forerunner of transgender direct action groups." She is a software engineer known for her contributions to SWI-Prolog.

== Transgender activism ==
Ogborn was an early practitioner of direct action in support of transgender rights. For instance, in 1991, transsexual woman Nancy Burkholder was expelled from the Michigan Womyn's Music Festival, a preeminent lesbian event. Ogborn coordinated a direct action, Camp Trans, to protest the transphobia of the festival leaders.

The first transsexual organization that Ogborn founded was KCGS, the Kansas City Gender Society. Ogborn started Transgender Nation, the transgender focus group of Queer Nation in San Francisco which included a new transgender caucus to fight transphobia in local debates. In 1993, Ogborn and Transgender Nation members protested the American Psychiatric Association's listing of transsexualism as a psychiatric disorder, and medical colonization of transsexual people's lives.

Ogborn was an early participant and organizer of the New Women's Conference, a retreat for post-operative transsexual women. She edited its newsletter, "Rights of Passage", which would later become the Transsexual News Telegraph. Her involvement with the New Women's Conference informed much of her later work.

Ogborn joined the Hijra community in 1994, claiming to be the first westerner to join the religious out-group.

She continues her activism for transgender and human rights.
