= Sky at Night =

Sky at Night may refer to:

- the night sky
- Sky at Night (album), a 2010 album by I Am Kloot
- The Sky at Night, a BBC television programme on astronomy
  - BBC Sky at Night, a BBC magazine associated with The Sky at Night

== See also ==
- night sky (disambiguation)
- Night (disambiguation)
- Sky (disambiguation)
