= Gunton (surname) =

Gunton is a surname. Notable people with the surname include:

- Bob Gunton (born 1945), American actor
- Colin Gunton (1941–2003), British theologian
- Elliott Gunton (born 1999), British cybercriminal
- Frederick Gunton (1813–1888), English organist
- George Gunton (1845–1919), American economist
- Mike Gunton, British television producer
- Rebecca Joanne Gunton (born 1976), birth name of English news presenter Becky Jago
- Samuel Gunton (1883–1959), English association football player
- Simon Gunton (1609–1676), English divine and antiquary
