= Oceans of the Mind =

First issue cover

Oceans of the Mind was a quarterly online science fiction magazine published in 2001–2006.

== History and profile ==
The first issue, appeared in Fall 2001, was published in print version, then it was released in PDF format via e-mail. The magazine was published by Trantor Publications in Jacksonville, FL. Each themed issue focused on some aspect of the future, such as space colonization, future crime, spirituality, or the military. The magazine folded with the Spring 2006 issue due to a lack of subscriptions.

== See also ==
- List of defunct American periodicals
