= Takano Fusataro =

Japanese labor activist (1869–1904)

Takano Fusataro (高野 房太郎; January 6, 1869 – March 12, 1904) was a Japanese labor activist.

== Early life and America ==
Takano was born in Nagasaki on January 6, 1869. His father was a tailor. The family moved to Yokohama when Takano's uncle offered his father a better job. However, Takano's father died shortly after starting a business there, and the business burned down two years after that. Takano had to work to support the family immediately after graduating from elementary school. While working, he attended the Commercial School in Yokohama.

Takano moved to San Francisco in 1886, where he studied English and briefly opened a store. He continued supporting his family in Yokohama by sending money back to them. He moved to Seattle, then Tacoma and began studying the history of labor. He wrote for publications in the United States and Japan, and in one of his Japanese publications he introduced the American labor movement to the Japanese.

== Return to Japan ==
In 1892, Takano returned to San Francisco and joined the Shokko Giyūkai (職工義友会). He also began corresponding with Samuel Gompers in 1894 and went to New York City. After getting advice from Gompers about starting labor unions in Japan, he returned to Japan in 1894. In the meantime his younger brother, Takano Iwasaburo, had worked to become a professor at Tokyo Imperial University and had become well-versed in the socio-political situation regarding Japanese labor. Fusataro had to change the philosophy that Gompers and the American Federation of Labor gave him in order to work with the Shakai Seisaku Gakkai and Japan's political climate create successful unions. He took a page from George Gunton's book and said that higher pay and better working conditions for workers improve the economy as a whole, and emphasized workforce education, rather than strikes, to improve wages.

When he returned to Japan, Takano initially took a position as a reporter for the Japan Advertiser. The Shokko Giyukai held their first Japanese meeting on April 6, 1897. It was attended by several hundred people, and Takano and his fellow activists, Jo Tsunetaro and Sawada Hannosuke, handed out educational pamphlets. They formed the Rodo Kumiai Kiseikai on July 7, 1897, and Takano served as the head of the organization. They helped to form the Iron Workers' Union in December 1987, and formed several others in the year after. However, after the passage of the Peace Preservation Law in 1900, it became illegal for workers to ask for raises. After the law was passed, Takano became a correspondent for the Japan Advertiser in China. He died in Qingdao on March 12, 1904.
