= The Alternate Source Programmer's Journal =

American magazine

- Categories: Computer magazine
- Frequency: Bimonthly
- Founder: Joni Kosloski, Charley Butler
- Founded: October 1979
- First issue: January 1980
- Final issue Number: 1984; 19
- Company: TASMON
- Country: United States
- Language: English

The Alternate Source, also known as The Alternate Source Programmer's Journal, was a magazine of technical programming articles, most of which were at the assembly language level, focused on the TRS-80 Model I and Model III. A few articles related to the TRS-80 Color Computer.

It was published by Charlie W. Butler (d. September 11, 2014) and Joni M. Kosloski of The Alternate Source, a major TRS-80 software publisher, from around 1980 to around 1983. TAS was known for the high intensity level of its articles and as such was the "prestige" technical journal of the time. Among its contributors were Jake Commander, Jack Decker, Bruce Hansen, Larry Kingsbury, Dennis Kitsz, Steven Kovitz, Alan Moluf, Troy L. Pierce, and Gordon Williams.

The meaning behind the name "The Alternate Source" is that TAS set itself up as being an alternative to the official software and information coming from Radio Shack, the manufacturer of the TRS-80.
