= Transsexual News Telegraph =

- Summer 1993 cover
- Editor: Anne Ogborn, Gail Sondegaard
- Frequency: Quarterly
- First issue: 1991
- Final issue: 2002
- Country: United States
- Language: English

Transsexual News Telegraph was a quarterly news and topics magazine published in United States from 1991 to 2002. TNT covers often portrayed Trans Identities or Art and the back covers were usually a piece of graphic art with a thought provoking theme.

TNT originally was published as Rites of Passage, the official publication of the New Women's Conference, with Anne Ogborn as the editor. It began as a magazine for the then nascent post op movement. After two issues the magazine came under the editorship of Gail Sondegaard, changed its name to Transsexual News Telegraph, and ceased being officially tied to the New Women's Conference.

TNT continued to be published approximately quarterly until 2002. In 1999 Katherine Collins joined the paper as Art Director. She and Gail Sondegaard continued publishing until 2002, when publication ceased.

The magazine was published in 8½ × 11 inch format saddle stitched 48 pages over most of its life. After 1998 publication became less frequent and the publication grew thicker.

TNT always had a strong anti neo-colonization medical emphasis, and featured many articles on trans related art and cultural events, reviews of relevant movies, as well as "News On The March", a section of transsexual related news.

Never with a very large subscriber base, the magazine had more influence because of its status as a tool for discussions among trans activists during the emergence of the transgender rights movement.

In the mid-1990s TNT began organizing issues of the magazine around specific topics.

== Notable articles ==
- Early (1992) coverage of trans man Loren Cameron's photography
- Transgender Liberation (1993)
- Saheli! Anne Ogborn's recounting of experiences with the Hijra community
- Nancy Nangeroni's "Gender Identity Disorder: What to Do?," on DSM categorization and pathologization of gender difference (1997)
- On Being a Trans-Parent (Issue #9, Autumn 2000) Jamison Green
