= Gulfscapes Magazine =

Gulfscapes Magazine was a lifestyle magazine for those who live or vacation along the Gulf coast. The magazine emphasized home design and travel. Articles offered information on home interiors; coastal recreation; food; travel destinations; and style. The magazine was created in 2001 in Port Aransas, TX by Victoria Munt Rogers.

Publication editorial and coverage included the five states that border the Gulf of Mexico: Alabama, Florida, Louisiana, Mississippi and Texas.

Standard sized, 8.375 x 10.875, the magazine was printed using a web offset process in full colour, and used 'perfect-binding'.

Distribution included a pre-paid subscription base, targeted mail-outs and retail sales in more than 600 locations within HEB, Super Wal-Marts, Rouses, Publix, Barnes&Noble, Hastings and IGA. The magazine was also sold on Amazon.com.

Magazines were sold in 11 states including: Texas, Alabama, Oklahoma, Louisiana, Arkansas, Florida, Mississippi, Georgia, New Mexico, Illinois and Tennessee.

As of 2013, the magazine was no longer published.
