= The Master Skier =

The Master Skier, later known as The Master Skier Annual Ski Journal, was the official ski journal of the U.S. Ski and Snowboard Association, the U.S. Ski Team, and the American Cross Country Skiers Association. It existed between 1987 and August 2019.

== History and profile ==
Established in 1987, The Master Skier was published quarterly until 2009 when its frequency switched to annually. It was headquartered in Escanaba, Michigan. August 2019 issue was the final edition of the magazine.

== Features ==
The journal was the largest circulation Nordic skiing publication with over 50,000 readers.

With special emphasis on technique and race articles, it focused on Nordic skiing, and was the only publication that reached all members of Nordic skiing's two largest organizations: the U.S. Ski & Snowboard Association, and the American Cross Country Skiers Association.

The journal was distributed to its subscribers, over 410 retailers, 32 cross-country ski clubs, and 20 Nordic teams. It was also distributed at World Cup races in North America.

Its writers included current and former Olympic and World Champion skiers.

Contributing editors were Andy Newell, Kikkan Randall, Jessie Diggins, Kris Freeman, Chandra Crawford, Brian Gregg, Caitlin Gregg, Bryan Fish, Jenny Bender, Sophie Caldwell, Dave Cieslowski, Jim Galanes, Chris Carmichael, Glenn Bond, Janice Sibilia, Dr. Joe Bouscaren, Dave Jarrett, Murray Banks, Dr. Jim Stray-Gunderson, Yuriy Gusev, Jon Engen, Ian Harvey, Dr. Gabe Mirkin, J. D. Downing, Jack Sasseville, Dan Heil, Liz Stephen, Holly Brooks, Matt Liebsch, Andy Liebner, Noah Hoffman, Andrew Joda, David Lawrence and Matt Whitcomb.

The publisher and editor were Robert B. Gregg and Nancy E. Gregg
