= The GAO Review =

American magazine (1966–1987)

- Type: Quarterly Periodical
- Format: Magazine
- Publisher: Government Accountability Office
- Founded: 1966
- Ceased publication: 1987
- Language: English
- Headquarters: Washington, D.C.
- ISSN: 0016-3414

The GAO Review was an American magazine published during the late 20th century. It was published by the Government Accountability Office of the United States Congress. It began in 1966 and ceased publication in 1987. It was succeeded by The GAO Journal.

The purpose of the magazine was to cover government and defense auditing topics, document the activities of the GAO, and provide a forum for GAO employees.
