= Brainstorm NW =

US magazine (1997–2009)

Brainstorm NW was a magazine published out of Lake Oswego, Oregon. Its motto was "The magazine for northwest decision makers" and it covered political issues, feature stories and art and entertainment. The magazine was politically conservative and published for 12 years starting in 1997 and ending February 2009.

== History ==
Brainstorm magazine became Brainstorm NW in 2001 when it was purchased by investors. The magazine ceased operations due to economic conditions affecting many publications in 2009.
