= Southern Literary Journal and Monthly Magazine =

Southern Literary Journal and Monthly Magazine was a journal founded in 1835 by Daniel K. Whitaker and published until 1837 by J.S. Burges from Charleston, South Carolina.

Its primary contributor was William Gilmore Simms, whose most notable article is "American Criticism and Critics."

WorldCat records a The Southern Literary Journal, and Magazine of Arts published between 1837 and 1838, also from Charleston.
