= Avances Magazine =

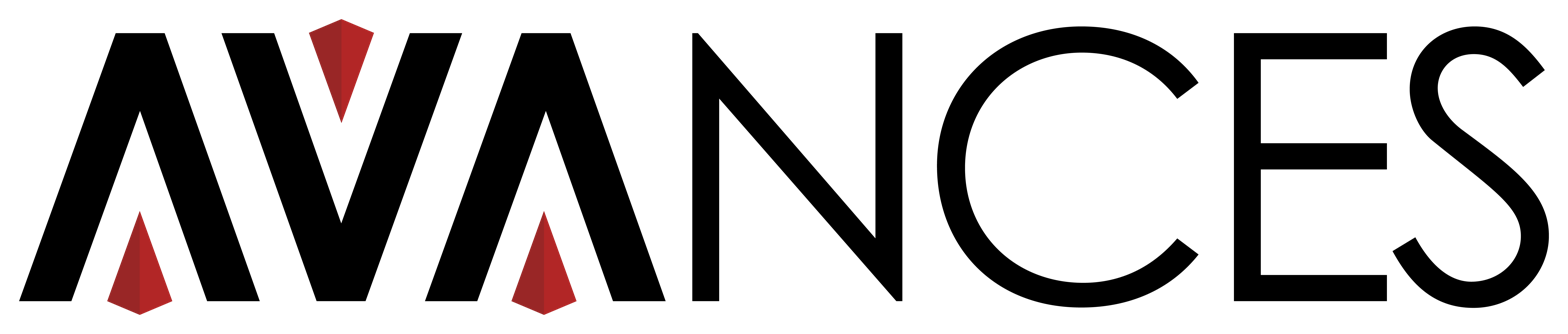
- Logo for AVANCES Magazine
- Editor-in-Chief: Tareq Butler
- Staff writers: Staff Managing Editor: Elvecia Ramos; Contributing Editors: Adam Legas, Javier Estrada; Translation Editor:Wendy Estrada; Account Executive: Teresa Noriega, Ozzie Feo; Distribution: Polite Latino
- Categories: Spanish-language magazines
- Frequency: Monthly
- Circulation: 20,000 per monthly (2009)
- Publisher: Tareq Butler
- First issue: June 2007
- Final issue: November 2012
- Company: Avances Magazine
- Country: United States
- Based in: Utah
- Language: English / Spanish
- Website: AvancesMagazine.com

Avances Magazine was a monthly bilingual publication aimed at middle to upper income Hispanics and was the largest Hispanic magazine in the Intermountain West, which includes Arizona, Colorado, Idaho and Utah. The magazine is based in Orem, Utah in the United States. With its first edition in June 2007, Avances Magazine's motto is to "Advance the Hispanic Community". The magazine ceased publication in November 2012.

== Content ==
Avances Magazine had two goals; to bring interesting and entertaining articles that would help to educate and increase prosperity within the Hispanic community and to help companies enter into the growing Hispanic marketplace. The articles within Avances were written by politicians, business owners, motivational writers, community leaders, and others that succeeded in family or business life. Two of the most popular contributing editors are Adam Legas and Javier Estrada. Legas is a mixed martial arts trainer and writes about fitness and nutrition. Javier Estrada wrote articles on sales, leadership and management.

== U.S. immigration controversy ==
In March–April 2010, Avances published a number of articles favoring the controversial 2010 Arizona Immigration Law, which created emotional and racial responses in and around the Hispanic community. The Support Our Law Enforcement and Safe Neighborhoods Act (introduced as Arizona Senate Bill 1070 and thus often referred to simply as Arizona SB 1070) is a legislative act in the U.S. state of Arizona that instituted broad and strict anti-illegal immigration measure in decades. It received national and international attention and spurred considerable controversy.

In mid April, the magazine's website was hacked by a group calling itself the Albakatils Organization which replaced the home page with its own. The altered page depicted blood dripping from the title "Hacked" with a background color of blood red. Zone-H.org reports the organization’s base of operations to be out of Pristina, Serbia. KSL-NBC News also reported the administrators’ password had been changed to "H8 Mexicans".

== Layout ==
Avances Magazine followed a typical magazine format by featuring a letter from the Editor, articles, and advertisements. While the majority of the advertisements were not Hispanic businesses, there were many advertisements that focused solely on the Hispanic community as it was their core business. Subsequent issues of Avances included word count, interesting photos, and a larger font.

== Circulation, distribution, readership ==
There were 80,000 magazines printed monthly. Avances was a subscription magazine as well as having distribution placed on 600 newsstands or business countertops as well as mailed to over 500 waiting rooms. Circulation was concentrated in the western states of California, Arizona, Oregon, Washington, Idaho and Utah. According to Avances Magazine, readership was generally 70 percent Hispanic and 30 percent non-Hispanic.
