= LAN Times =

Print and online information journal

- Former editors: Christopher Null (1997–1998)
- Categories: Computing magazine
- Frequency: Biweekly
- Publisher: Tom Bunnell
- Founder: Judith Clarke
- First issue: 1984; 42 years ago
- Final issue: 1999; 27 years ago
- Company: Novell, Inc.
- Country: United States
- Based in: San Mateo, California
- Language: English
- Website: archive.org/details/pub_lan-times
- ISSN: 1040-5917

LAN Times was a print and online information journal dedicated to covering issues of technology and network computing, including local area network information. The publication was headquartered in San Mateo, California, and published print journals as well as online articles from 1988 to 1999.

The publication featured an online help forum for network administrators, and published a variety of books on computer networking. It was published on a biweekly basis.

It was published by the McGraw-Hill Companies, Inc. until May 1998, when it was sold to CMP Media. Following the change over the ownership the magazine continued to be based in San Mateo, California. The print publication was shuttered in 1999 and lantimes.com was redirected to networkcomputing.com
