= Blodau Yr Oes =

19th-century monthly Welsh-language periodical

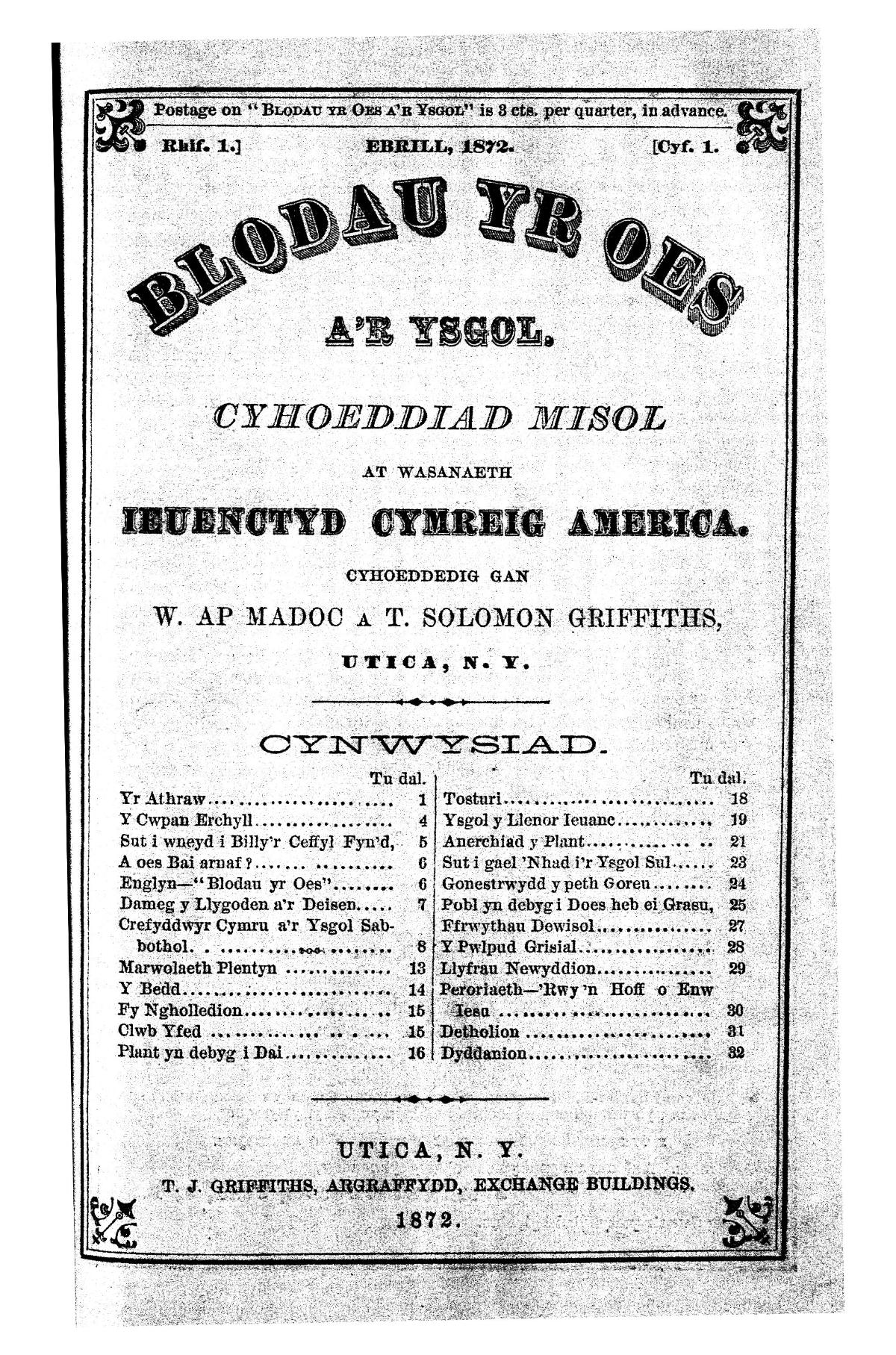
The first issue of Blodau Yr Oes (April 1872)

Blodau Yr Oes ("Flowers of the Age") was a 19th-century monthly Welsh-language periodical, first produced in 1872 by T. J. Griffiths, Utica, New York. The full title was Blodau Yr Oes A'r Ysgol. It was aimed at children attending Welsh Sunday schools in America. Its first editors were William ap Madoc and T. Solomon Griffiths. They were later replaced by Calvinist Methodist minister, Morgan Albert Ellis (1832–1901), who had emigrated to the US in 1853, and the Congregationalist minister and Eisteddfodwr Thomas Edwards (bardic name Cynonfardd, 1848–1927).
