= Bomb Rack =

Bomb Rack was a 9.5×13-inch-size free magazine-newspaper produced by the 20th Air Force for United States Army Air Forces airmen serving at AAF bases on Guam, Tinian, and Saipan in the months following World War II. Although serious articles occasionally appeared within, Bomb Rack's tone was often light-hearted and humorous with numerous photos and pin-ups, as well as a full page of locally drawn cartoons. Sports were covered extensively, as were topics important to airmen at the time such as education and returning to the United States as quickly as possible. The exact number of issues published is unknown, but copies were distributed at least between October 7, 1945, and January 21, 1946, and ran through number 16. Bomb Rack's length was eight pages, but sometimes also included a one-page bulletin containing official information. Unlike the Air Force's official histories from the time that focused on operations, manpower, and so forth, periodicals such as Bomb Rack provide a glimpse of everyday life in the Air Force.

== History ==
Bomb Rack was established on Guam by Joe Whitley, who joined the Air Force at Randolph Field in 1943 and worked in public relations there until he was assigned to the 7th AAF at Hickam Field, Hawaii as correspondent for the 7th. It was a weekly magazine for the B-29 crews and ground forces. Whitley was a correspondent and covered raids from Guam, Saipan, Tinian and Iwo Jima. Whitley later wrote the book Pacific Paradise with Clive Howard.

Volume one number one was October 7, 1945. During World War II, AAF organizations and units often had their own newsletters, so it is possible that the 20th Air Force also had a newsletter that preceded Bomb Rack. That, however, is speculation, and precisely when the magazine ceased production is also unknown. From 1945 to 1949, the 20th Air Force's headquarters was located at Harmon Field near the cliffs above Guam's famous resort beach on Tumon Bay, and a newsletter entitled Harmon Rocket was published at Harmon Field at least in 1945, though almost nothing is known of that publication. By 1949 Andersen Air Force Base, Guam's only remaining Air Force base, was publishing its own weekly paper called Tropic Topics.

== Format ==
What makes Bomb Rack more of a "magazine" than a newspaper or newsletter is its size, the quality of its paper, and most significantly, its format. Each issue's cover is a single photograph (except for October 7, 1945, which is a sketch of then Lieutenant General Nathan Farragut Twining) with a brief mention of the content. Issues normally included a letters page, a political cartoon (sometimes military related), numerous feature stories, a sports section, and a cartoon page.

== Extant editions ==
Bomb Rack was published for at least four months, but out of the seventeen printed only the following twelve editions are known to have survived:

- October 7, 1945 / Vol 1 No 1
- October 14, 1945 / Vol 1 No 2
- October 21, 1945 / Vol 1 No 3
- December 3, 1945 / Vol 1 No 9
- December 10, 1945 / Vol 1 No 10
- December 17, 1945 / Vol 1 No 11
- December 24, 1945 / Vol 1 No 12
- December 31, 1945 / Vol 1 No 13
- January 7, 1946 / Vol 1 No 14
- January 14, 1946 / Vol 1 No 15
- January 21, 1946 / Vol 1 No 16
- January 28, 1946 / Vol 1 No 17

== Cartoon page ==
On the last page of most issues was an entire page of four to six one-panel comics of surprisingly high quality in terms of art and humor. Jokes usually dealt with life in the military, but also included sly commentaries on post-war civilian life, relations with women, and native islanders. Among the cartoonists was at least one who achieved considerable fame working for Mad Magazine in the postwar period: Dave Berg (cartoonist).
