= George Gunton =

American trade unionist

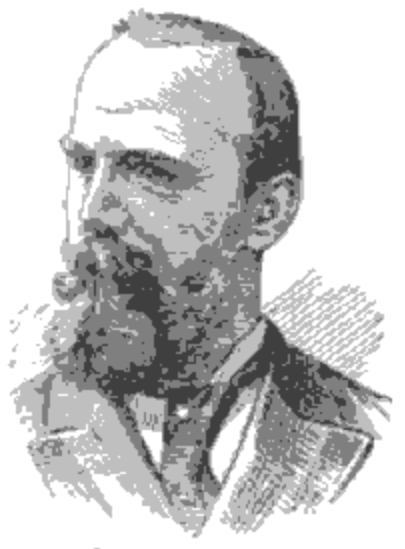

Personal details
- Born: September 8, 1845 Chatteris, England
- Died: September 11, 1919 (aged 74) New York City
- Occupation: Trade unionist

George Gunton (September 8, 1845 – September 11, 1919) was an influential figure in the labor movement of the United States around the turn of the 20th century and was an avid supporter of industrial combinations and trusts. He was a close colleague of Ira Steward, and upon Steward's death in 1883 he agreed to complete and prepare for publication a book that Steward had been writing. Gunton found only notes, not a nearly complete book. Deciding the notes were not sufficient for editing, Gunton discarded them, instead building on the ideas of his colleague to formulate his own book on the labor movement, Wealth and Progress, which was published in 1887, followed by Principles of Social Economics in 1891. He founded a school, the Institute of Social Economics, in 1891, with the aim of educating the masses in the path of responsible citizenship.

Gunton was the editor of Gunton's Magazine, a goal-oriented publication, which drew many prominent thinkers of his time. An early supporter and adviser to Theodore Roosevelt, Gunton later became a vocal critic of the president, when the administration began attacking trusts, forming a Bureau of Corporations with full investigative powers in 1903. Though Gunton was accused in his life of being bought by big business, he genuinely believed, and made good argument to the fact, that well organized capital was vital to the protection of the rights of a well-organized labor force.

== Philosophy ==
George Gunton was of a scientific mind and thus rooted his philosophy in the principle of evolution. He articulated the principle of evolution as the development from the simple and similar to the complex and heterogeneous. In other words, as a system develops, it becomes increasingly multifaceted and specialized.

Applying this view of progress to human society, Gunton distinguished three elements at play within this process – material, intellect, and morality. He saw the material factor as the most fundamental, initiating social development through human want and the exploitation of nature. Intellect is the guide of humanity, and morality is the result. For example, in the case of altruism, the moral codes against murder or theft are rooted in self-preservation, the gains to be had from being a member of a stable society outweighing the gains of the immediately selfish act. He believed that the development of egoistic wants stimulated man's intellect, which in turn differentiated, specialized, the field of morality and thus the conscious egoism and unconscious morality transforms into unconscious egoism and conscious morality. So ultimately, it is the development of man's desires that leads to the development of moral character.

Gunton saw the exploitation of nature as man's greatest power, and he saw no limit to the progress that could be made by its harnessing. In relation to matters of the labor movement, he saw this as the key to the mutual benefit of worker and employer. Gunton was an enthusiastic optimist, believing nature to be an unending wealth from which all could reap. All that was needed to augment the technological advances now bringing nature under man's domination was a balanced system of organized capital and organized labor.

In regards to the organization of capital, Gunton was a defender of trusts. He believed that industrial combination and consolidation was not only inevitable, but also necessary to the protection of the worker. He saw small business as an enemy of labor. In his time, it was small businesses that were participating in petty practices such as blacklisting and organizing in "employer's associations" to engage in anti-union activity. In his view, the greater the capital investment, the more the employer has at stake, and thus the more likely the employer is to respond to the needs and wants of his workforce, to avoid loss due to a stop in productivity. Gunton contended that popular protest to industrial concentration was due to a misunderstanding of competition, from viewing competition from the standpoint of the receding competitor. For example, in the industry of fabric and textiles, a hand loom will lose out to a small factory. This is not an eradication of competition, it is a raising of the competitive plane. So the development of concentrated capital with better machinery and better facilities does not eliminate competition, it makes such organization necessary in all industries.

Gunton was ready to admit that trusts were responsible for abuses, but maintained that abuses were not inseparable from principle – "as is always the case in social revolts, the genuine are arraigned with the spurious and all are put under the ban."

== Institute of Social Economics ==
In 1885 Gunton began an annual lecture series in the church of Rev. Herber Newton in New York City, which he continued for six years. This series led to the opening of the Institute of Social Economics, which opened in 1891 at 126 East Twenty-Third Street in New York. The institute was established not as a classical university, but as a venue to spread Gunton's specific message and with the goal of training the general public in becoming wholesome, rational citizens who understand politics, the economy and the responsibilities of being a citizen. It began as a night school and Gunton himself gave a free lecture every Wednesday evening. Soon the institute expanded to a day school as well, which offered a one-year course. Subjects included accounting, penmanship, arithmetic, rhetoric, business correspondence, commercial law, social economics, English and American literature, civil government and principles of economics and practical statesmanship. Tuition was $150 per year and admission was open to both sexes.

By 1882, the institute had to move to 34 Union Square, a 6-story building that could accommodate the rapidly growing student body. It added a High school in 1894 and began offering classical studies as well, such as languages and law. The popular free Wednesday lectures continued, now with many guest speakers in addition to Gunton. In 1897 the institute moved yet again to a ten-story building at 41 Union Square. At this time, it was changed to the Gunton Institute and its vision changed greatly, now with the aim of educating the citizenry of all the United States. It became primarily a correspondence school. The home study plan offered a two-year curriculum, each year independent of the other. Gunton's weekly lecture was printed and mailed to students who had to complete required reading, including Gunton's Magazine, correspond with teachers regarding any questions, and complete a written theses at the end of each year.

By October 1900, the lectures began to be printed monthly instead of weekly, then semi-monthly, then irregular, until the last was published in December 1903. The list of men associated with the institute included the following: Thomas Brackett Reed; Dr. Charles DeGarmo, president of Swarthmore; Theodore Roosevelt; Dr. Edwin R. A. Seligman; Carroll D Wright, U.S. Commissioner of Labor; Henry Cabot Lodge; David Starr Jordan, president of Leland Stanford jr. University; G. Stanley Hall, president of Stanford University; Booker T. Washington; and Archbishop Ireland.

== Gunton as an economist ==
There were three systems of economics recognized during those days. Gunton rejected Karl Marx, Henry George and the laissez-faire economics of Adam Smith, Thomas Malthus, David Ricardo, and John Stuart Mill. He did this in his Principles of Economics Inductively Considered and Practically Applied, With Criticisms on Current Theories, Outlines of Social Economics, Wealth and Progress, and Economic Heresies of Henry George. Gunton was of the tradition of protectionism, otherwise known as the American System of Political Economy. Gunton followed in the footsteps of Alexander Hamilton, writer of the 1790 Report on Manufacturing, Mathew Carey, Friedrich List, Daniel Raymond, greatest American 19th-century economist and most prolific writer of his time, Henry Charles Carey, William Elder, author of Questions of the Day, and Conversations on Political Economy, Vanburen Denslow, and the American Protective Tariff League in rejecting the British System of Laissez faire, and also socialism. Gunton is cited in George Boughton Curtiss' The Industrial Development of Nations volume 2 and Protection and Prosperity.

Gunton rejected Malthus and Ricardo's theories on, rent, land, population. Marx adopted the rent theory, and also the wages fund theory of Ricardo. Smith's conception of scientist not being producers was rejected, as science played a crucial role in productivity for an economy, and that human beings were not capital. Human beings brought skill to the process of manufacturing and agriculture, this was fostered by developing his natural talents. Animals and other forms of capital do not have that. The human is the only creative species.

Along with economists of the British school, Gunton refuted Darwin's survival of the fittest. He reasoned that natural selection would give way to inferior type of cultivating and breeding. Gunton was of the opinion that scientific selection attributed to creativity superseded natural selection. Unconscious selection did not create the type of horses that scientific selection did. Thus scientific selection could breed out inferior breeds of a particular horse, the variety of sheep we have today is not because they were gladiators same goes for cats and dogs. The seedless fruit or vegetable, the various types of oranges were not a product of laissez faire but of creativity.

== Gunton's Magazine ==
Gunton's Magazine, also called The Social Economist, was unapologetically rooted in a specific ideology, it had a mission to disseminate correct ideas. It had the freedom to do this as it required little advertising through means of endowment. Though it was begun as an adjunct to the Institute of Social Economics, it soon became Gunton's primary activity. Though it was primarily a vehicle for Gunton's philosophy, it also included articles on other matters of contemporary interest such as "Women's opportunity for Social Service", "Colored Men as Cotton Manufacturers" ,"Do the Filipinos Desire American Rule?", and "Shall the Ballot be Given to Women?"

Many contributors to the magazine were well known and respected. Carroll D. Wright wrote an article almost every issue during the early years. Edwin R. A. Seligman contributed about half a dozen articles and Theodore Roosevelt wrote "The Need of a Navy" in the January 1898 issue.

== Personal life ==
George Gunton was born in Chatteris, Cambridgeshire, England on September 8, 1845. He was the only son of Mathew Gunton, an English agricultural laborer. With no means for formal education, George Gunton still exhibited and avid interest in learning and read widely.

At age 17, he married Elizabeth Bocock, by whom he had 8 children. In 1874 he left his family in England for America, where he had secured work as a weaver in the cotton mills of Fall River, Massachusetts. He separated from his first wife in 1882, seven years after she and his family had joined him in Fall River. In 1884 he married Mrs. Amelia Whipple, who aided him in becoming established in New York City. Gunton divorced her some time before 1904 and on February 14, 1904, he married Mrs. Rebecca Douglas Lowe. Mrs. Lowe was the president of the General Federation of Women's clubs from 1901 to 1905 and was the widow of a prominent Georgian banker. In 1906 Mrs. Amelia Whipple Gunton sued Gunton to test the legality of their divorce, which she claimed he did not tell her about until some time later. She also sued Mrs. Lowe allegedly alienation the affections of Mr. Gunton. The rulings and findings of the suit were kept private.

George and Amelia Gunton lived in Hot Springs, Virginia until they separated in July 1915. Amelia was granted an uncontested divorce on the grounds of infidelity on November 21, 1916. George Gunton lived in obscurity in New York until his death at Bellevue Hospital on September 11, 1919.

== Sources ==
- Weary, Daniel C. "George Gunton, Advocate for Labor, Defender of Trusts, Social Darwinian" Harvard University. April 13, 1949
- Gunotn, George. "Trusts and the Public"
- Bailey, Thomas A. "A Diplomatic History of the American People" 1946
- Beard, Mary R. "A Short History of the American Labor Movement" 1920
- Cahill, Marion C."Shorter Hours, A Study of the Movement Since the Civil War" 1932
