= Takano Iwasaburo =

Japanese social statistician and labor activist

- 高野岩三郎
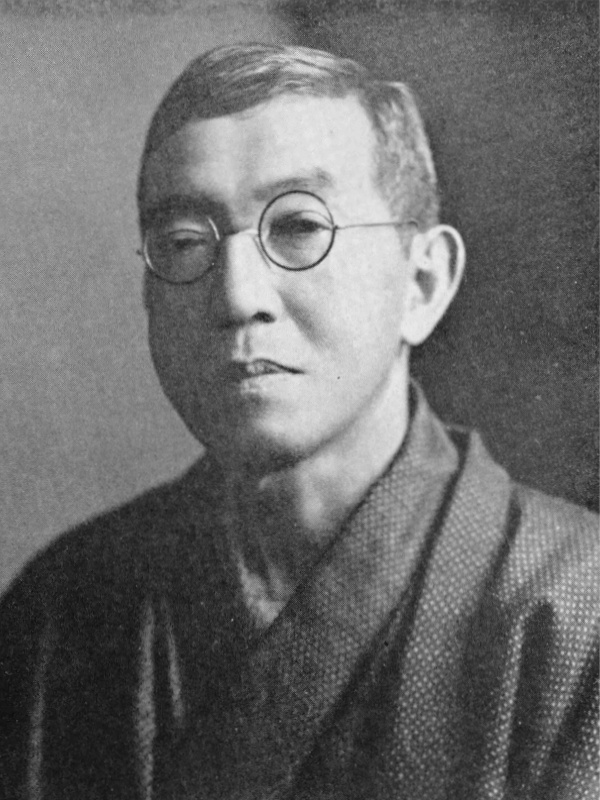
- Born: October 15, 1871; Nagasaki, Japan
- Died: April 5, 1949 (aged 77)
- Education: Kaisei Academy; First Higher School, Japan; Tokyo Imperial University
- Occupations: Social statistician, labor activist

Takano Iwasaburo (高野 岩三郎, Takano Iwasaburo; October 15, 1871 – April 5, 1949) was a Japanese social statistician and labor activist.

== Early life and education ==
Takano was the younger brother of Takano Fusataro. He was born on October 15, 1871, in Nagasaki, Japan. He attended what is now the Kaisei Academy, the First Higher School, and the Tokyo Imperial University (now called the University of Tokyo). Takano's university education was partially funded by Fusataro's work in the United States. He studied at the Ludwig-Maximilians-Universität München from 1899 to 1903, where he met his wife, Barbara. They had a daughter in 1902. After returning to Japan, he earned a Doctor of Law in 1904.

== Career ==
Takano began teaching at the Tokyo Imperial University in 1903. Some of his notable students include Morito Tatsuo, Ōuchi Hyōei, and Maide Chogoro. Takano was also one of the founding members of the Shakai Seisaku Gakkai, a research organization. Of the Shakai Seisaku Gakkai members, Takano was one of the first to discuss trade unions. While no unions existed in Japan yet, he was very pro-union, a sentiment shared by Fusataro.

In 1910, Takano and other members of the University's economics department lobbied for the economics department to become independent, rather than sharing a college with those studying law or government. Not only was Takano's goal to ground the curriculum in empirical research, but he also hoped that being independent would lead to more political activism within the department. However, the creation of the new department was very slow because of funding concerns. Takano threatened to quit in May 1917, but stayed after the university said they would hurry things up. The new department was established in 1919.

Even though the department had been established, Takano left the university in 1920 to head the Ohara Institute for Social Research. After World War II, he helped to form the Japan Socialist Party and was part of the Constitution Investigation Association. He then became the head of the NHK in 1946. He was the head of the Japan Statistical Society in 1948.

Takano died on April 5, 1949.
