= 80 Micro =

Computer magazine published between 1980 and 1988

- June 1983 issue
- Publisher/Editor: Wayne Green
- Categories: Computer magazine
- Frequency: Monthly
- Publisher: 1001001 Inc. (as 80 Microcomputing or 80 Micro), CW Communications (as 80 Micro)
- First issue: January 1980
- Final issue Number: June 1988; 101
- Country: United States
- Based in: Peterborough, New Hampshire
- Language: English
- ISSN: 0744-7868

80 Micro was a computer magazine, published between 1980 and 1988, that featured program listings, products and reviews for the TRS-80.

== History ==
First issue (January 1980)

Wayne Green, the creator of many magazines such as 73, founded 80 Microcomputing as a spinoff of his Kilobaud Microcomputing solely for Tandy Corporation's Radio Shack TRS-80 Model I microcomputer. Like his other magazines it encouraged readers to submit articles and reviews. A 1980 advertisement for the magazine promised that it would "tell you the truth ... the good things about the TRS-80 and the not so good" because "Wayne Green has never been one to mince words". By 1982 80 Micro was the third largest magazine in terms of obtaining advertising, selling 152,000 issues; only Vogue and BYTE were larger. Renamed 80 Micro on issue 30 in June/July 1982, the magazine's November 1982 issue had 518 pages, the most in its history for a regular issue.

Green attributed the magazine's success to Radio Shack's policy of not allowing other companies to distribute their products through their stores, while other stores would not carry the products as Radio Shack customers did not visit them. 80 Micro became the most accessible venue for small companies to advertise their TRS-80 products. Despite a Tandy executive writing a column for the magazine, Tandy also prohibited the Radio Shack stores it owned from selling or displaying 80 Micro so as to not lose sales to the magazine's advertisers, and Green—who claimed that most stores kept a copy hidden from "company spies"—asked readers to persuade franchise and other non Tandy-owned stores to sell the magazine.

80 Micro's success encouraged other publishers to start platform-specific computer magazines; Harry McCracken described PC World as "essential an 80 Micro clone that happened to be about Windows, not TRS-80's". In May 1983 CW Communications purchased 80 Micro and most of Green's other magazines. As Tandy introduced other computers 80 Micro also covered them, but in 1983 it discontinued coverage of the Model II/12/16 and moved coverage of the Color Computer to the separate Hot CoCo. In January 1988 80 Micro began only covering Tandy's MS-DOS computers such as the 1000. The change failed, and the magazine published its last issue in June 1988.

== Features ==
Programming contests for young children were featured annually, and were noted by both the Scholastic Corporation and the Boy Scouts of America. The magazine challenged readers to write complete games, sometimes including scoring, on just one line of BASIC code. Creativity was remarkable and included techniques to allow for a slightly longer line of code than originally envisioned. The magazine featured program listings for the machine, primarily written in BASIC and occasionally Z80 assembly language. These programs were printed in the magazine, but could be purchased on cassette tape and diskette media under the name Load 80 to save some typing. The magazine also featured articles, letters, reviews and humor (including - from January 1980 through July 1983 - the monthly Kitchen Table International satire/parody column).
