= GAO Journal =

American magazine

The GAO Journal
- Type: Quarterly Periodical
- Format: Magazine
- Owner: Government Accountability Office
- Publisher: Government Accountability Office
- Editor-in-chief: Stephen Altman
- Founded: 1988
- Ceased publication: 1992
- Language: English
- Headquarters: Washington, D.C.
- ISSN: 1045-3261

The GAO Journal was an American magazine published during the late 20th century that succeeded The GAO Review. It was published by the Government Accountability Office of the United States Congress. It began in 1988 and ceased publication in 1992.

The purpose of the Journal was to cover government and defense auditing topics and document the activities of the GAO. Whereas the Review had primarily been an internal publication the intent of the Journal was to speak more in the direction of an outside audience.

== Issues of the Magazine ==
Contents of the issues are within the scope of the GAO web site search as of January 2009.

- № 1, Spring 1988, GAO Report #135522
- № 2, Summer 1988, GAO Report #136522
- № 3, Fall 1988, GAO Report #137156
- № 4, Winter 1988, GAO Report #137885
- № 5, Spring 1989, GAO Report #138529
- № 6, Summer 1989, GAO Report #139236
- № 7, Fall 1989, GAO Report #140060
- № 8, Winter/Spring 1990, GAO Report #140949
- № 9, Summer 1990, GAO Report #141719
- № 10, Fall 1990, GAO Report #142368
- № 11, Winter 1990/91, GAO Report #142941
- № 12, Spring 1991, GAO Report #144262
- № 13, Summer/Fall 1991, GAO Report #145024
- № 14, Winter 1991/1992, GAO Report #146024
- № 15, Spring/Summer 1992, GAO Report #147027
- № 16, Fall/Winter 1992, GAO Report #147985
