= TooSquare Magazine =

American magazine

TooSquare Magazine was a large, underground fanzine magazine which was published in Tampa, Florida between 2001 and 2002. It had a large distribution of 10,000 copies per month and was known for its in depth coverage of music, art, and underground culture. During its 2½ year run it won the Weekly Planet 'Best of the Bay' award in 2002. TooSquare Magazine also won web site of the week on April 24, 2002. TooSquare Magazine and its editor, Joseph Murphy were featured in the book about underground magazines Zine in 2011. A reference was also found to the corporate entity of TooSquare Magazine here.

TooSquare featured interviews, goth models, and rockabilly style culture mixed with often bizarre articles about skinheads and conspiracy theory on Skull and Bones.

The creator Joseph Murphy was interviewed by various other eZines, including Legion Studios.
