= Midnight Engineering =

Defunct American computer magazine

Midnight Engineering was a bimonthly magazine that was published by William E. "Bill" Gates (not to be confused with William Henry Gates III, the founder of Microsoft), from December 1989 to 2001. The first issue appeared in January/February 1990. The target audience was primarily hardware and software engineers running their own small businesses or holding "day jobs" and "burning the midnight oil" developing products or services to allow them to become independent entrepreneurs. The headquarters was in Rocky Ford, Colorado.

There is still a conference associated with readers of the magazine, initially called ME SKI in 1992, renamed to ENTCON (Entrepreneurs Conference) shortly thereafter, and transformed into EntConnect in 2003. It is still held early each Spring in Denver, Colorado, and attended most years by the magazine's founder, Bill Gates.
