= NextStepU =

NextStepU was a magazine which was founded in the United States in 1995 by David Mammano to help students plan for college, careers and life. It is a national publication for high school students that is distributed in 20,500 high schools in 50 states. The magazine is headquartered in Rochester, New York, where the first issue was published May 17, 1995. The magazine was last published in Fall 2019 and exists as an online college planning resource.

In 2008, the Association of Educational Publishers (AEP) named the magazine as a finalist in the "whole publication" category. In 2007, the magazine won AEP's "periodical of the year" title in the young adult category. AEP has previously awarded Next Step the following awards: "whole publication design" (2006), "most improved" (2006), finalist, "best educational portal" (2004), "most improved" (2003) and "best how-to article" (2002).
