= Samuel Gunton =

English footballer

Personal information
- Full name: Samuel Arthur Gunton
- Date of birth: 1883
- Place of birth: Norwich, England
- Date of death: 1959 (aged 75–76)
- Place of death: Norwich, England
- Position: Right back

Youth career
- –1908: Norwich St James

Senior career*
Years	Team	Apps	(Gls)
1908–1910	Norwich City		
1910–1911	Doncaster Rovers		(0)
1911–1912	Gainsborough Trinity	30	(0)
1912–1913	Burnley	1	(0)
- * Club domestic league appearances and goals

Samuel Arthur Gunton (1883–1959) was an English professional footballer who played in the Football League for Gainsborough Trinity and Burnley as a right back.

== Personal life ==
Gunton served in the Norfolk Regiment between 1899 and 1908. After the outbreak of the First World War in 1914, he was recalled to the army and served as a sergeant with the Norfolk Regiment and the Royal Dublin Fusiliers during the war.
