= OverRev =

OverRev magazine was a monthly periodical devoted to sport compact and import drag racing and street performance. Printed in an oversized, "junior tabloid" format, the magazine was distributed through a network of several hundred tuner shops, at sport compact drag racing events, and by subscription. OverRev was not sold on newsstands - instead, it was available free of charge and was supported entirely by advertising revenue. The magazine was headquartered in Santa Ana, California.

== History ==
OverRev was started in September 2003. The first issue of the magazine was the August 2004 issue published in July, 2004. Originally a semi-monthly periodical, in early 2005 the magazine became a monthly title. OverRev is the third magazine produced by ProMedia Publishing, following Race Pages and Fastest Street Car. ProMedia Publishing's event division also produces the NMRA and NMCA domestic drag racing series. In early 2006, ProMedia discontinued OverRev magazine, citing ad sales that failed to reach the break-even point. The March, 2006 issue became the 16th and final issue of OverRev.

== Staff ==
OverRev magazine's founding Editors, Alex Keleman and Paul Huizenga, originally worked for ProMedia Publishing as Associate Editors for Race Pages and Fastest Street Car magazines before being selected to head the new title's editorial staff. Other staffers included Greg Acosta (Associate Editor), David Wong (Associate Publisher) and Lua Quant (Graphic Designer).
