= Innerloop Magazine =

Dance music magazine

July 2003 Cover of Innerloop

Innerloop Magazine was a dance music magazine based in Washington, D.C. from 2002–2004 and was a free publication distributed at record stores, clubs and other cultural hubs around the United States and in Europe.

Printed on newsprint, Innerloop was in tabloid format. The magazine featured electronic music artists, who typically did not have press agents or major label representation, with a strong focus on the Washington and Baltimore music scenes. The first cover of the magazine featured Washington's house music DJ Sam "the man" Burns. Innerloop's art director, London-based Ivan Cottrell, designed the magazine. Innerloop was featured in the U.K.'s Creative Review for its design. The Art Institute in Arlington, Virginia, and Maryland Institute College of Art in Baltimore, Maryland, also subscribed to Innerloop for its design students as a resource. Innerloop was also featured in the design textbook "Editorial Design" by Yolanda Zappaterra, along with other cutting-edge design publications Raygun Magazine and Bell du Jour.

Innerloop was founded by Courtney Reyers (Apple Rochez) and Ivan Cottrell as a joint, transcontinental publication. The staff was entirely volunteer, and included Stephen Ward, Christine Moritz, Andy Cerutti of 2Tuff, graphic artist Nils Davey, Jorge E. Bañales, Julie Carney, and Daniel Swierdsiol, among others over the years. Innerloop partnered with various clubs over the years, including Red, Five and the Edge in Washington and Sonar in Baltimore to present Innerloop-based parties. Courtney Reyers also hosted an Innerloop radio show on XM Radio's Channel 80 "The Move". In addition, the magazine joined up with many dance music web sites to feature its content, in Australia, South Africa, Europe and the States. The magazine closed in September 2004, with artists A Skillz and Krafty Kutz as its last cover feature.
