= Sackbut Review =

American quarterly magazine published in Milwaukee, Wisconsin

- An advertisement in HERESIES (Vol. 3, No. 2, 1980) for Sackbut Review.
- Editor: Angela Peckenpaugh
- Format: Print
- First issue: 1978
- Final issue: 1981
- Country: United States
- Based in: Milwaukee, Wisconsin
- Language: English

Sackbut Review was an American quarterly magazine published in Milwaukee, Wisconsin from 1978 until 1981. Founded and edited by Angela Peckenpaugh, the periodical's primary content were art, poetry, and short prose pieces.

In the 1981 Annual Report of The National Endowment for the Arts, Sackbut Review was listed as one of the recipients for "Assistance to Literary Magazines"—a category to "help nonprofit magazines finance special issues; improve format, design, production, or readership; or assist in long-range development plans."
