= Baseball Hobby News =

American magazine

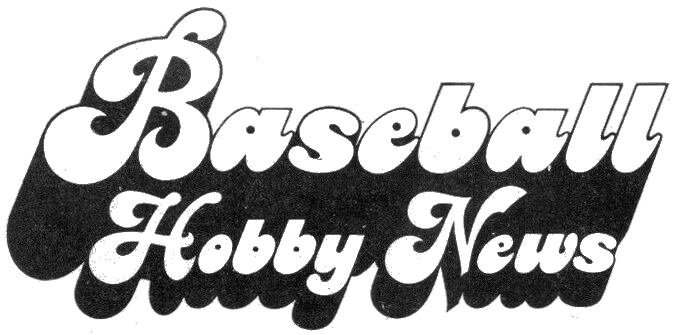
- Editor: Frank Barning
- Categories: Baseball memorabilia
- Frequency: Monthly
- Format: Tabloid
- Publisher: Vivian Barning
- Founder: Frank and Vivian Barning
- First issue: March 1979 in Glen Cove, NY
- Final issue: 1993; 32 years ago

Baseball Hobby News was a United States–based news-oriented magazine about the field of baseball memorabilia collecting. Founded in 1979 by the husband-and-wife team of Frank and Vivian Barning, who served as editor and publisher, respectively, the magazine was published on a monthly basis until 1993.

== Overview ==
The first issue appeared in March 1979. Vivian Barning has been a card collector as a child, and came back to the hobby with her husband in 1975. For most of its run, it appeared in a newspaper-style format, although it later converted to a tabloid size with a color cover.

The magazine primarily focussed on baseball cards, but also included coverage of many other baseball-related collectibles, including autographs, press pins, postcards, stamps, uniforms and other pieces of game-used equipment, and books and other publications. As its name implies, the paper placed an emphasis on news, offering extensive coverage of newly released cards and memorabilia, as well as reporting on developments within the hobby itself. It also featured more nostalgic pieces, including articles on older memorabilia as well as interviews with baseball players of the past. There were also frequent articles aimed at new collectors, offering advice on how to get started in the hobby.

The publication originally was based in Glen Cove, New York. It moved to San Diego, California, in 1982. The Barnings wrote many articles themselves, but also used contributions from a growing staff of writers and columnists.

In 1982 the packaging of Fleer's baseball card set touted that their 1981 set had been named the best of the year by Baseball Hobby News.

== Contents ==
Some of the regular features in Baseball Hobby News for at least parts of its run include:

- Who's Who In The Hobby, a collection of profiles of collectors from around the country, based on information provided by the collectors themselves. It was initially written by Dave Houser and for several years was produced by Brad Pueschel.
- Checklists of all known cards featuring a particular star player.
- Lists of addresses of professional players, for collectors to use in seeking autographs, often compiled by John L. Raybin.
- The BHN Price Poll, offering current average prices being offered on popular cards and sets by card dealers. Wade Baker produced this in BHN's later years.
- Dealer's Choice, an oft-humorous column by card dealer Richard West.
- The Inside Pitch, with thoughts from card dealer and journalist Nick Edson.
- According To Korda, musings by Ron Korda, a card collector who also worked for NBC.
- Reviews, usually written by Darrell Berger, of current books about baseball.
- Do You Remember, profiles of baseball players of the past. They were written by Rich Westcott, author of many baseball books including the Philadelphia Phillies' Encyclopedia.
- Coverage of errors and variations on cards (including new findings and responses to reader questions) by Ralph Nozaki, author of the book The Mistake Manual on the same subject.
- Listings of upcoming hobby shows around the country.
