= Wayne Green =

American writer and publisher (1922–2013)

Wayne Sanger Green II
- Born: September 3, 1922; Littleton, New Hampshire
- Died: September 13, 2013 (aged 91); Peterborough, New Hampshire
- Occupation: Publisher
- Known for: Founding the computer magazines 80 Micro, Byte, RUN and others.
- Call sign: W2NSD

Wayne Sanger Green II (September 3, 1922 – September 13, 2013) was an American publisher, writer, and consultant. Green was editor of CQ magazine before he went on to found 73, 80 Micro, Byte, CD Review, Cold Fusion, Kilobaud Microcomputing, RUN, InCider, and Pico, as well as publishing books and running Instant Software.

== Biography ==
In his editorial in the inaugural issue of 80 Microcomputing he said, "The first magazine I published was in 1952 about amateur radio Teletype. Later I became editor of CQ, a ham radio magazine. I started my own magazine for hams in 1960, that was 73 magazine. 73 is now the world's largest ham publication, with subscribers in over 200 countries. When MITS put the first microcomputer kit on the market in 1975 I organized and did most of the work to get Byte magazine started. When I felt there was a need for a magazine aimed at beginners in computing, I started Kilobaud Microcomputing in January 1977."

In the early 1980s, he assisted in the creation of the Brazilian microcomputing magazine, Micro Sistemas (in Portuguese). He sold five of his magazines to CW Communications in 1983, and his publishing company Wayne Green, Inc. subsequently merged with them.

Licensed by the Federal Communications Commission in the Amateur Radio Service with the callsign W2NSD, he was involved in a number of controversies and disputes in the Ham Radio world, notably with the ARRL and CQ magazines. Such controversies also occurred in the computer world; an advertisement for 80 Micro began "You may love Wayne Green ... you may hate him ... but you have to admit he has vision". It promised that the magazine would "tell you the truth" because "Wayne Green has never been one to mince words", adding "of course, 80 Microcomputing has the editorial fireworks from Wayne that the industry has come to expect". In his editorial in the inaugural issue of 80 Microcomputing, he said, "My outspokenness aggravates a lot of people, but...if I don't kick ass...I don't get results."

He used the backronym "Never Say Die" for the NSD in his amateur callsign. As of 2011 he lived in his wife's farmhouse in Hancock, New Hampshire and maintained a website with content from his online bookstore.

== See also ==
- Art Bell
