= Kilobaud Microcomputing =

Defunct American computer magazine

- August 1980 issue
- Publisher/Editor: Wayne Green
- Categories: Computer magazine
- Founded: 1977
- Final issue: 1983
- Country: United States
- Based in: Peterborough, New Hampshire
- Language: English
- ISSN: 0192-4575

Kilobaud Microcomputing was a magazine dedicated to the computer homebrew hobbyists from 1977 to 1983. It was one of the three influential computer magazines of the 1970s, along with BYTE and Creative Computing. It focused mostly on the kit-build market, rather than the pre-assembled home computers that emerged, and as the kit market declined in the early 1980s, Kilobaud lost relevance and closed in 1983. After this, company continued publishing other magazines dedicated to particular platforms rather than the kit market.

== Beginnings ==
Wayne Green was the founder and publisher of BYTE magazine, one of the influential microcomputer magazines of the 1970s. After putting out four issues, in November 1975 Green came to work and found that his ex-wife and the rest of the Byte magazine staff had moved out of his office and had taken the January issue with them. Consequently, the January 1976 issue had Virginia Green listed as publisher instead of Wayne Green.

Green was not happy with this development, so he left to start a new magazine to compete with the fledgling Byte. He wanted to call it "KiloByte" to trump Byte. But the people of Byte quickly trademarked KILOBYTE as a cartoon series in Byte magazine. So he named the new magazine "kilobaud" instead, a title Green admitted was largely meaningless. The magazine was first published in 1977.

== Name changes ==
The full title for the first magazines was kilobaud. The Computer Hobbyist Magazine (Jan 1977). These issues are unique for having a full index of the contents on the front cover but no illustrations (photographs). Later issues did have illustrations but also still had a full index on the cover, (a feature that remained for many years). The title was now shortened to only read "Kilobaud Microcomputing".

From the beginning of 1979 to the end of 1980 the subtitle "for business...education...FUN" was added. Later, after 1981, the "kilobaud" denominated was dropped altogether and the magazine was now simply called "Microcomputing" with the subtitle, "a wayne green publication". In 1984, the magazine collapsed.

After the success of kilobaud, Wayne Green diversified with magazines targeted to specific brands of home computers, such as 80-Microcomputing (also known as 80-Micro) a Magazine for TRS-80 users, InCider a magazine for Apple II users, Hot CoCo a magazine for TRS-80 Color Computers, RUN a magazine for Commodore 64 users and many others.

== Intended readership ==
Even more than Byte magazine, kilobaud contained articles written for people who were building their own 8-bit microcomputers at home, or were writing homebrew software for these systems. kilobaud, (much more than Byte) contained articles written for electronic engineers (or hobbyists interested in electronics), rather than for people who were technically interested in computers but not in building their own computer from scratch. Articles like "Two Hobbies: Model Railroading and Computing" and the article (written by Don Lancaster) "Building a cheap video display for your Heathkit H-8" (a computer you could build yourself from a kit) are good examples.

In the May 1982 issue an article about building the Sinclair ZX-81 kit, the first, (and probably last) "mainstream" "do-it-yourself" computer kit was published.

== See also ==
- ABC 80 performance test
