= Noggin (magazine) =

Former American magazine

- Noggin Magazine V.3, N.10, August 1992
- Editor: Tom Hunter
- Categories: art, fiction, politics, social issues, popular culture, cartoon
- Frequency: 6 per year
- Paid circulation: free
- Unpaid circulation: 10,000
- Total circulation: 10,000
- First issue: October 1990
- Final issue: 1993
- Company: Noggin Magazine
- Country: United States
- Language: English
- Website: Nebraska Writer {1990}

Noggin was an American magazine that published art, fiction, cartoons, and social and political commentary. It started in Iowa City, Iowa in 1990, and published semimonthly for three years.

== History ==
The magazine was founded by Tom Hunter; both were covered in articles in the Cedar Rapids Gazette, and the Iowa City Press-Citizen. Launched in October 1990, the publication had a "press run" of approximately 10,000 per issue. The magazine did not accept advertisements, and a lifetime subscription cost US$10. All writers and contributors to the magazine were unpaid volunteers, and the majority of them chose to publish their work under pseudonyms. Expenses per issue were $1,000. Prior to founding the magazine, Hunter had been a writer of fiction for ten years, and had received a Bachelor's Degree in the field of journalism.

Every issue of the publication contained the request for contributions, "If you like to draw, write fiction, poetry or essays, Noggin wants to publish your work." In an interview with Cedar Rapids Gazette, the founder of the publication explained its broad attitude towards acceptance of contributions: "The editorial principle we've stuck to, to our detriment sometimes, we do not edit people's stuff, especially on the grounds of content. It's a real big umbrella. When you say I will take anything, you have more people that come forward." The magazine provoked controversy when it published works by artist Scott Warren about Edward Gein, and also over an article "Lunacy in the Gulf" in January 1991 which was critical of the Gulf War.

== Reception ==
In 1992, the Cedar Rapids Gazette called Noggin, "one of Iowa City's most controversial publications". The publication was classed among "small news magazines" distributed in the region. The Iowa City Press-Citizen characterized the magazine noting, "Noggin is a liberal newspaper of fiction, poetry, essays and art."
