= Night Sky (magazine) =

Discontinued American bimonthly magazine

Night Sky is a discontinued American bimonthly magazine for entry-level stargazers. It was published between May/June 2004 and March/April 2007 by Sky Publishing, which also produces Sky & Telescope (S&T).

Night Sky was intended to be less technical than S&T. The target audience was recreational naked-eye and low-power instrument observers. The magazine was discontinued because of low sales, and subscriptions were converted to an equal number of issues of S&T.
