= Dwang =

Bracing piece used between wall studs

In construction, a dwang (Scotland and New Zealand), nogging piece, nogging, noggin or nog (England and Australia; all derived from brick nog), or blocking (North America), is a horizontal bracing piece used between wall studs to give rigidity to the wall frames of a building. Noggings may be made of timber, steel, or aluminium. If made of timber they are cut slightly longer than the space they fit into and are driven tightly into place or rabbeted into the wall stud. Although noggings between vertical studs brace the studs against buckling in compression they provide no bracing effect in shear, which requires diagonal bracing to stop the frame racking.

The interval between noggings is dictated by local building codes and by the type of timber used; a typical timber-framed house in a non-cyclonic area will have two or three noggings per storey between studs. Additional noggings may be added as grounds for later fixings and are supplemented by lintels, sills and jack studs to form openings.

Joist bridging, or blocking, is used between floor or ceiling joists, but this is to prevent the joists from twisting or rotating under load rather than to prevent buckling in compression. Herringbone strutting may replace blocking with smaller, timber battens fixed diagonally, in pairs, between joists.

== See also ==
- Blocking (construction)
- Carpentry
