= NutriMag (magazine) =

NutriMag (NutriMag Magazine)
- Editor-in-Chief: Jacob Frank
- Categories: nutrition sports science fitness
- Frequency: 9 issues total
- First issue: March 1999; 27 years ago
- Final issue: October 2001; 24 years ago
- Company: Nutri-Sport
- Country: United States
- Based in: San Diego
- Language: English
- Website: http://www.nutrimag.com

NutriMag Magazine was an American publication on nutrition, sports science and fitness in the United States (1999–2001, 9 issues). It focused discussions on the real facts of the supplement industry. It was the official magazine of the Nutri-Sport Nutrition stores.
