= Gunton's Magazine =

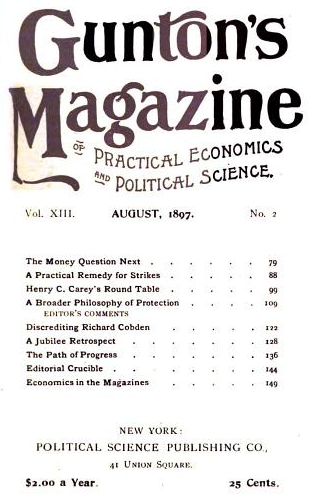
Gunton's Magazine, 1897

Gunton's Magazine was an American journal edited by George Gunton. It focused on "practical economics and political science." It was founded in 1891 as The Social Economist and was renamed Gunton's Magazine of American Economics and Political Science in 1896 before being shortened to Gunton's Magazine in 1898. The journal was published on a monthly basis and had a Republican stance. It ceased publication in 1904.
