= Hooey =

American satirical magazine

Hooey was a humor magazine published by Popular Magazines in the 1930s. The magazine presented spoof ads and articles much in the manner popularised by the 1950s magazine Mad.
