= Zygote in My Coffee =

- Categories: Poetry magazine
- Frequency: Consumer
- Founder: Brian Fugett
- First issue: December 2003
- Final issue: May 30, 2014
- Country: US
- Based in: Kettering, Ohio
- Language: English
- Website: Zgote Inmycoffee

Zygote in My Coffee (often referred to simply as Zygote) was a popular underground independent print and online magazine that ran from December 31, 2003 until May 30 of 2014, which dealt mostly in experimental and "street" poetry, though it also published content such as short fiction, social commentary, political rants, one-act plays, erotica, and adult-oriented comic strips. The magazine was started in San Jose, California by poet and cartoonist Brian Fugett, who later moved to and published out of Kettering, Ohio. At one time, co-editors included Karl Koweski, Aleathia Drehmer, and C. Allen Rearick.
