= List of software for the TRS-80 =

The TRS-80 series of computers were sold via Radio Shack & Tandy dealers in North America and Europe in the early 1980s. Much software was developed for these computers, particularly the relatively successful Color Computer I, II & III models, which were designed for both home office and entertainment (gaming) uses.

A list of software for the TRS-80 computer series appears below. This list includes software that was sold labelled as a Radio Shack or Tandy product.

== Model I ==
Cat. No.	Title	Type	1st Appearance	Vendor	Format
26-2002	Cassette Editor/Assembler	Programming Language	1978	Tandy Corporation	Cassette Tape
26-2005	Level II Basic Instruction Course Part I	User Instruction Manual	1979	Tandy Corporation	Cassette Tape
26-2006	Level II basic Instruction Course Part II	User Instruction Manual	1979	Tandy Corporation	Cassette Tape
26-2009	Tiny Pascal	Programming Language	1980		

== Model II ==
Cat. No.	Title	Media	1st Appearance

== VideoTex ==
Cat. No.	Title	Media	1st Appearance

== Color Computer ==
=== Color Computer 1 & 2 ===
Cat. No.	Title	Media	1st Appearance
26-2222	Videotex	Program Pak	RSC-6
26-2537	Space Probe: Math		RSC-10
26-2550	Clowns and Balloons		RSC-8
26-2551	The Hound of Baskervilles		RSC-8
26-2552	Moby Dick		RSC-8
26-2553	20,000 Leagues Under the Sea		RSC-8
26-2567	Klendathu		RSC-10
26-2568	Vocabulary Tutor 1		RSC-8
26-2569	Vocabulary Tutor 2		RSC-8
26-2624	Pioneers in Technology		
26-2625	Inventions that Changed Our Lives		
26-2626	TRS-80 Chemistry Lab, Vol. I		
26-2709	TRS-80 Color PILOT	Cassette	
26-2710	TRS-80 Color PILOT	Disk	
26-2717	Super LOGO		
26-2721	Color LOGO	Disk	
26-2722	Color LOGO	Program Pak	
26-3019	Diagnostic ROM		RSC-4
26-3021	Screen Print Program		RSC-6
26-3050	Chess	Program Pak	RSC-4
26-3051	Quasar Commander	Program Pak	RSC-4
26-3052	Pinball	Program Pak	RSC-4
26-3053	Football	Program Pak	RSC-4
26-3055	Checkers	Program Pak	RSC-4
26-3056	Super Bustout	Program Pak	RSC-6
26-3057	Dino Wars	Program Pak	RSC-6
26-3058	Skiing	Program Pak	RSC-6
26-3059	Color Backgammon	Program Pak	RSC-6
26-3060	Space Assault	Program Pak	RSC-6
26-3061	Art Gallery	Program Pak	RSC-6
26-3062	Zaxxon		
26-3063	Project Nebula	Program Pak	RSC-6
26-3064	Cyrus		
26-3065	Polaris	Program Pak	RSC-6
26-3066	Galactic Attack		RSC-8
26-3067	Wildcatting		RSC-8
26-3070	Color Robot Battle		RSC-9
26-3071	Roman Checkers		RSC-8
26-3073	Poltergeist		RSC-9
26-3075	Color Cubes		RSC-8
26-3076	Mega Bug		RSC-8
26-3077	Micro Painter		RSC-8
26-3079	Castle Guard		RSC-9
26-3080	Tennis		RSC-8
26-3081	Monster Maze		RSC-9
26-3082	Crosswords		RSC-9
26-3083	Gin Champion		RSC-9
26-3085	Microbes		RSC-8
26-3086	Slay the Nerius		RSC-10
26-3087	Clowns and Balloons		RSC-9
26-3088	Shooting Gallery		RSC-8
26-3089	Canyon Climber		RSC-9
26-3090	Popcorn	Program Pak	RSC-8
26-3091	Double Back		RSC-9
26-3092	Reactoids		RSC-10
26-3093	Dungeons of Daggorath		RSC-10
26-3095	Color Baseball	Program Pak	
26-3101	Personal Finance	Program Pak	RSC-4
26-3102	Investment Analysis		RSC-6
26-3103	Color File		RSC-6
26-3104	Spectaculator		RSC-6
26-3105	Color Scripsit (1981)	Program Pak	RSC-6
26-3109	Color Scripsit II (1986)	Program Pak	
26-3149	Atom	Program Pak	
26-3150	Bingo Math	Program Pak	RSC-4
26-3151	Music	Program Pak	RSC-4
26-3152	Typing Tutor		RSC-6
26-3153	Color Computer Learning Lab	Cassette	RSC-6
26-3154	Handyman		RSC-6
26-3156	Audio Spectrum Analyzer		RSC-8
26-3157	Graphics Pak		RSC-9
26-3158	Bridge Tutor		RSC-8
26-3250	Editor Assembler With ZBug		RSC-6
26-3255	Color Scripsit	Disk	RSC-8
26-3256	Spectaculator	Disk	RSC-8
26-3260	Personafile	Disk	RSC-8
26-3299	Sands of Egypt	Disk	RSC-9
26-3300	Images 1		RSC-9
26-3301	Images 2		RSC-9
26-3310	Pyramid	Cassette	RSC-8
26-3311	Raaka-Tu	Cassette	RSC-8
26-3312	Bedlam	Cassette	RSC-8
26-3313	Madness and the Minotaur		RSC-9
26-3320	Card Games		RSC-9

=== Color Computer 3 ===
Cat. No.	Title	Media	1st Appearance

== Model III ==
Many of these titles also ran on the Model I, as the Model III was designed to be backward-compatible with the Model I.

Cat. No.	Title	Media	1st Appearance
26-1566	Visicalc		
26-1562	Profile		
26-1565	Microfiles		
26-1705	Advanced Statistical Analysis		
26-1604	Versafile		
26-1563	Scripsit	Disk	
26-1505	Scripsit	Cassette	
26-1564	Mailgram		
26-1552	General Ledger I		
26-1553	Inventory Control		
26-1554	Accounts Payable		
26-1555	Accounts Receivable		
26-1556	Payroll	Disk	
26-1557	Concrete Take-Off		
26-1558	Business Mailing List		
26-1559	Manufacturing Inventory Control		
26-1560	Fixed Asset Accounting		
26-1503	Mailing List	Cassette	
26-1504	Level II Payroll	Cassette	
26-1508	In-Memory Information		
26-1571	Real Estate I		
26-1572	Real Estate II		
26-1573	Real Estate III		
26-1574	Real Estate IV		
26-1577	Surveying		
26-2201	FORTRAN		
26-2202	Macro Editor/Assembler		
26-2203	COBOL		
26-2204	Compiler BASIC		
26-1704	Double Precision Subroutines		
26-1507	Standard & Poor's STOCKPAK System		
26-1603	Budget Management		
26-1509	Trendex Stock Package		
26-1802	“Quick Watson” Deduction Game		
26-1806	Casino Games Pack		
26-1904	Micro Marquee	Cassette	
26-1905	Flying Saucer	Cassette	
26-1906	Invasion Force	Cassette	
26-1907	Checkers 80	Cassette	
26-1908	“Eliza” Artificial Intelligence	Cassette	
26-1909	Pyramid	Cassette	
26-1910	Haunted House	Cassette	
26-1911	Dancing Demon	Cassette	
26-1912	Space Warp	Cassette	
26-1956	Zaxxon		
26-1605	Astrology	Cassette	

== Model 16 & 16B ==
Cat. No.	Title	Media	1st Appearance

== Model 4, 4D & 4P ==
Cat. No.	Title	Media	1st Appearance
26-1608	DeskMate	Disk	1984

== Model 12 ==
Cat. No.	Title	Media	1st Appearance

== MC-10 ==
Cat. No.	Title	Media	1st Appearance
?	Lost World Pinball	cassette	?
?	Solit	cassette	2008
?	MCBomb	cassette	2008
?	Boarder	cassette	2008
?	Invader	cassette	2008
?	MCMine	cassette	2008
?	Sentinel	cassette	2008
?	Jeweler	cassette	2008
?	Frog	cassette	2008
?	Mahjong	cassette	2008
?	Dungeon	cassette	2008
?	Tank	cassette	2007
?	Cupid	cassette	2006
?	Flight	cassette	2008
?	Risk	cassette	2009
?	Chess	cassette	2010
?	Sokoban	cassette	2008
?	Life	cassette	2008
?	Lander	cassette	2009
?	Kursk	cassette	2009
?	Alert	cassette	2007
?	MCTrek	cassette	2006
?	Rescue	cassette	2011
?	ABM	cassette	2009
?	Gargoyle	cassette	2010
?	Quest1	cassette	2010
?	Tankcap	cassette	2010
?	Rainmaze	cassette	2010
?	Raider	cassette	2010
?	Kuiper	cassette	2010
?	Centi	cassette	2010
?	Treasure	cassette	2011
?	Slots	cassette	2011
?	Demon	cassette	2011
?	Newpoker	cassette	2011
?	BGammon	cassette	2012
?	Txtadv	cassette	2010
?	Subhunt	cassette	2010
?	Grapher	cassette	2011
?	RedGreen	cassette	2011
?	Starfind	cassette	2011
?	SSheet	cassette	2011
?	Sudoku	cassette	2011
?	Car	cassette	2011
?	Clue	cassette	2011
?	Otho36	cassette	2011
?	Paravia	cassette	2011
?	Dogstar	cassette	2011
?	Rover	cassette	2011
?	Monster2	cassette	2008
?	Vader	cassette	2006
?	Rat	cassette	2007
?	Skyscape	cassette	2011
?	MCTetris	cassette	2006
?	Missile	cassette	2006
?	Haunt	cassette	2010
?	Subsrch	cassette	2006
?	Trebuchet	cassette	2011
?	Mnoply	cassette	2012
?	TrekIII	cassette	2012
?	Bandit	cassette	2012
?	Defcon1	cassette	2012
?	Maze	cassette	2012
?	BJack	cassette	2012
?	Jet	cassette	2006
?	Berzerk	cassette	2010
?	Poker	cassette	2010
?	Alien	cassette	2010
?	QBert	cassette	2010
?	Enigma	cassette	2010
?	Taipan	cassette	2010
?	Snakebit	cassette	2010
?	Loderun	cassette	2010
?	Scramble	cassette	2010
?	HRace	cassette	2010
?	Galilean	cassette	2010
?	Asimovian	cassette	2010
?	Pitman	cassette	2010
?	CSS	cassette	2010
?	MCJoust	cassette	2012
?	Dracula	cassette	2012
?	Dogfight	cassette	2012
?	Klondike	cassette	2012
?	Coloroid	cassette	2012
?	Monopoly	cassette	2012
?	RRoid	cassette	2012
?	Tycoon	cassette	2012
?	Music	cassette	2012
?	Four	cassette	2012
?	Lumpies	cassette	2012
?	Neptune	cassette	2012
?	Cave3D	cassette	2012
?	Trade	cassette	2012
?	Maxit	cassette	2012
?	Sabotage	cassette	2012
?	AQuest	cassette	2012
?	Blockout	cassette	2012
?	Columns	cassette	2012
?	Gbusters	cassette	2012
?	Boxing	cassette	2012
?	DrWho	cassette	2012
?	Switch	cassette	2012
?	Tugawar	cassette	2012
?	Killer	cassette	2013
?	Tholian	cassette	2013
?	Advent1	cassette	2013
?	Engineer	cassette	2013
?	Tutstomb	cassette	2013
?	Penguino	cassette	2013
?	Doctor	cassette	2013
?	Andromed	cassette	2013
?	Zymon	cassette	2013
?	Grail	cassette	2013
?	Beetrap	cassette	2013
?	Romp	cassette	2013
?	Batlbots	cassette	2013
?	Crawl	cassette	2013
?	Draughts	cassette	2013
?	Pipes	cassette	2013
?	NFlight	cassette	2013

== Model 100 & 102 ==
Cat. No.	Title	Media	1st Appearance
