= Scripsit =

Word processing application

- SuperScripsit 1.0
- Developer: Tandy
- Release: 1978; 48 years ago
- Operating system: TRSDOS, Xenix, MS-DOS
- Type: Word processor
- License: Proprietary

Scripsit (usually rendered in official marketing and support documents as SCRIPSIT) is a word processing application written for the Radio Shack TRS-80 line of computers. Versions were available for most if not all computers sold under the TRS-80 name, including the TRS-80 Color Computer and several pocket computer designs, as well as the Tandy version of the Xenix operating system. Tandy Corp. also produced a version running under MS-DOS for its line of PC compatible computers (Tandy 1000 and successors). Some of the 8-bit versions are tape-based and have no ability to read or write to disk.

The word scripsit is a Latin verb equivalent to the English "wrote". It was often used as an inscription indicating the identity of the person who wrote something.

== Functionality ==
Scripsit is a rudimentary word processor. It has basic text entry and margin controls, as well as word wrap. Many versions tied to specific platforms were available, and each version had its own set of features. Most versions supported variable width fonts, specifically for daisy-wheel printers. None had support for graphics other than some character macros depending on the version. The version for the TRS-80 Model I had special handling to make it possible to use lowercase letters, even though the hardware itself did not support mixed-case type.

Despite its limitations, Scripsit was seen at the time as a killer application for the TRS-80 line of machines, along with other breakthrough applications such as VisiCalc. It was Radio Shack's top-selling program for the consumer-oriented Models I and III. Its main competitor was Michael Shrayer's Electric Pencil. Scripsit dominated its market because, at first, no other TRS-80 word processor was available through the ubiquitous Radio Shack retail stores, with alternatives only being known and made available to the public in the TRS-80 computer press, such as 80 Micro magazine.

The software market evolved quickly, however, and Scripsit's popularity soon gave way to popular packages running on other more computers. Tandy released Scripsit for the Tandy 1000, 2000, and other MS-DOS computers, but 80 Micro's 1986 review found that it was slower than WordStar, with an awkward user interface, and more expensive than Microsoft Word. While approving of its flexibility, the magazine wondered if the company released the DOS version to a market with numerous competitors because of "stubborn pride? Homage to a classic name from the TRS-80 days?". 80 Micro in 1988 described it as "unusable".

Word processors typically require the use of special function keys to access editing commands as opposed to text entry. This proved to be a challenge on the TRS-80 Models I and Model III, as their keyboards had no non-typewriter modifier keys—not even Control. Instead, Tandy uses @ to access features such as margin control and load/save. Other common features are implemented as key combinations using Clear, and, lacking ⇪ Caps Lock, the combination ⇧ Shift+0.

By contrast, the DOS version of Scripsit assigns up to 60 commands to function keys with modifier keys, which 80 Micro described as "a good idea that Scripsit takes to extremes".

== SuperScripsit ==
Scripsit's main menu

An upgraded disk-only version named SuperScripsit was available with spellchecking for some platforms, specifically the Model I, Model III, and Model 4. This version basically matches the functionality of the normal Scripsit for disk-based platforms such as the Model II, Model 12, and Model 16. Some additional features such as boilerplating and integration with Profile, Tandy's database program for all of their TRS-80 platforms, are available for the disk versions.

Starting SuperScripsit led to a main menu of tasks such as "Open", "Proofread", or "Setup". Presumably because of the limited screen area on most TRS-80 models, there were no visible menus on the editing screen. RAM was probably also an issue, since selecting each of the options resulted in heavy floppy disk activity.

SuperScripsit for the Models III and 4 could handle text files larger than memory by paging text data in and out of RAM to disk (effectively a virtual memory technique, but implemented by an applications program). Sometimes (often, according to some frustrated users) this feature malfunctioned and created a garbled data file. Rescue utilities were made available to rectify this situation.

== Scripsit Pro ==
This was an all-new version written for Tandy/Radio Shack by CompuSoft. The author was Samuel A. Solomon. Scripsit Pro required a TRS-80 Model 4 equipped with the full 128 KB RAM. The text buffer was limited to 32 KB and it lacked SuperScripsit's ability to page text from disk. However, it could hold a second 32K text document in banked RAM and split the screen to permit editing of both documents at once, and to transfer text between the two buffers. It could also chain text files, handle footnotes and columnar text, and included a spell checker with a customizable dictionary. The documentation included instructions for the creation of custom printer drivers.

== Varsity Scripsit ==
Varsity Scripsit for MS-DOS was Tandy's first software sold outside Radio Shack stores. While criticizing its slow performance, 80 Micro in 1988 approved of its ease of use, low price and features. The magazine concluded that Varsity Scripsit "is a tremendous improvement over its predecessor".

== Bugs ==
Scripsit had a number of significant bugs that could result in the loss of work. The Model 4 version, for example, would inject random text throughout the document if the user held the control key ('@') down for more than a few seconds. If the machine turned off or was reset while a document was still open, the software could not open the document ever again.

Early versions had the counter-intuitive step of "closing the file" which required a special operation before saving and exiting the file. If this step was omitted, the file could not be opened again. No warnings were issued beforehand. This was eliminated in newer versions of Scripsit.

== Printing support ==
One handy and somewhat innovative feature for the time was the ability to add custom control characters in the printer setup. This allowed the user to take advantage of new features in a printer that were not intrinsically supported by Scripsit, such as different fonts or colours, or printing extended ASCII characters to produce simple lines and boxes. This was possible as printer manuals of the day included a full list of supported control character sequences for such functionality.

80 Micro criticized the MS-DOS version of Scripsit for only supporting Tandy printers. Varsity Scripsit added support for non-Tandy printers.

== Notable users ==
Isaac Asimov used Scripsit running on a TRS-80 Model II Computer for over nine years, and wrote over 11 million words with the program. British thriller author James Follett also used Scripsit, running on a TRS-80 Model I, to write The Tiptoe Boys, which was filmed as Who Dares Wins. James Fallows praised Scripsit as "the word-processing program I prefer above all others ... the best program on the market".

On the TV program Mr. Wizard's World, Mr. Wizard (Don Herbert) used Scripsit on a TRS-80 Model 16 to demonstrate spell checking.
