= TRS-80 Model II =

Tandy Radio Shack small-business computer launched in 1979

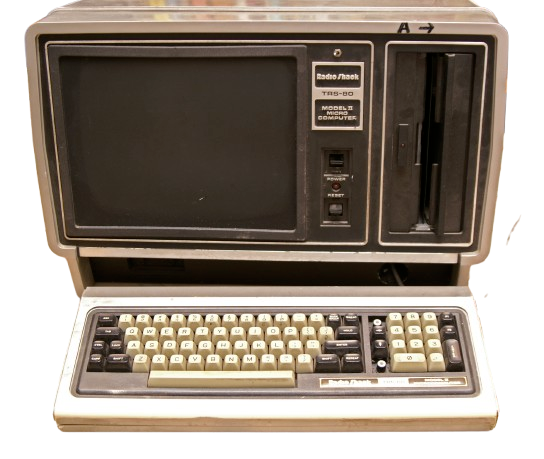
- TRS-80 Model II
- Manufacturer: Tandy Corporation
- Type: Personal computer
- Released: October 1979; 46 years ago
- Introductory price: US$3,450 (equivalent to $15,300 in 2025) (32KB); US$3,899 (equivalent to $17,300 in 2025) (64KB)
- Operating system: TRSDOS, Microsoft BASIC
- CPU: Z80A @ 4 MHz
- Memory: 32 or 64KB RAM
- Storage: Singled-sided Shugart 500k 8" floppy drive
- Display: 80x25 text
- Input: Detachable keyboard
- Dimensions: 14 x 21 1/4 x 23 1/2 inches (355.6 x 539.8 x 597 mm)

The TRS-80 Model II is a computer system launched by Tandy in October 1979, and targeted at the small-business market. It is not an upgrade of the original TRS-80 Model I, but a new system.

The Model II was succeeded by the compatible TRS-80 Model 12, Model 16, Model 16B, and the Tandy 6000.

== Model II ==
=== Background ===
Tandy was surprised at the strong demand for the TRS-80 Model I from business purchasers. The computer was too limited for such use, so the company began development on the Model II in late 1978. It was announced in May 1979, deliveries began in October, and only Tandy-owned Radio Shack stores sold the computer. Tandy advertised the Model II as "a business computer — not a hobby, 'home' or personal computer". It claimed that the computer was "ideal for a small business, and also 'just right' for many time-consuming jobs within larger businesses", including those with mainframes or minicomputers. The base single disk version was US$3,450, and a four disk version was US$6,599.

=== Hardware ===
As a professional business machine, the Model II used state-of-the-art hardware and has numerous features not found in the Model I, such as the high-speed 4 MHz Z80A, DMA, vectored interrupts, a detachable keyboard with two function keys and numeric keypad, and port instead of memory-mapped I/O. It has 80x25 text display and a single-sided 500 KB 8" floppy drive, and either 32 or 64 KB of RAM, along with two RS-232 ports and a Centronics-standard parallel port. The video memory can be banked out of Z80 memory, so that the entire 64 KB address space can be used for main memory. Unlike most computers, it has no BIOS ROM except a small boot loader (the BIOS was loaded off the boot floppy). Because of this and the use of port I/O, almost all of the Model II's memory can be used by software. The Model II runs the TRSDOS operating system (renamed to TRSDOS-II starting with version 4.0) and BASIC. The different disk format and system architecture make it impossible to run Model I/III software on the Model II, and the II's software library is smaller. This is mitigated by the CP/M operating system for the Model II from third parties such as Pickles & Trout; unlike the Model I/III, the Model II's memory map is compatible with standard CP/M. Three internal expansion slots can be used for add-on cards, such as additional serial ports and bitmap graphics.

The floppy drive included with the Model II is a Shugart SA-800 full-height, single-sided 8" drive; like most such drives, it spins continuously whether the disk was being accessed or not and the motor is powered directly off the A/C line. The floppy controller in the Model II is a double-density, soft-sector unit based on the WD 1791 floppy controller. Like with the Model I/III/IV, boot disks on the Model II require Track 0 to be single density. CDC drives are used for the floppy expansion module.

The keyboard is a capacitive keyboard made by Keytronic Corporation. Like most capacitive keyboards, it utilizes a key mechanism with foam rubber disks; these are prone to dry-rotting with age and requiring replacement. A later version of the keyboard was made by Cherry Corporation, but still uses the capacitive technology rather than the more well-known Cherry mechanical keyswitches.

The disk format on the Model II closely follows the IBM 3740 standard, which specifies 77 tracks, 26 sectors per track, soft sector formatting, and a sector size of 128 bytes for a formatted capacity of about 250 KB, but the Model II had a double density controller, so the disk format uses 256 byte sectors and formatted capacity is about 492 KB. If users install a double-sided drive they can get 1 MB of space, but this requires a modified DOS and Radio Shack did not officially support the use of double-sided drives.

There were several hardware revisions to the Model II over its lifespan. The first revision models (1979–80) cannot boot from a hard disk, and the floppy controller requires a terminating resistor pack for the last drive on the chain, instead of the standard method of putting a terminating resistor pack on the internal disk drives. The external resistor pack works by looping back the I/O lines on the external floppy connector to the SA-800 drive's terminator pins. This unusual setup was chosen so the users would not have to remove the cover and install or remove a terminating resistor pack on the floppy drive every time they wanted to remove or attach external disk drives. It proved to be problematic since customers who lost their resistor packs cannot use their machines (Radio Shack sold replacement packs for $50) and Model IIs sold from 1981 onward use a different floppy controller that does not require it. Hard disks offered for the Model II also use a terminating resistor pack. These were sold as master and slave drives, with the master hard disk (which has the resistor pack) needing to be the last one on the chain. Like most hard disks offered on 8-bit computers, there is no subdirectory support and the drive is treated by the OS as a large, fast floppy disk.

The Model II is so noisy that users reported physical discomfort and reluctance to use the computer. Unlike the Model I/III, the Model II also has a case fan due to the heat generated by the 8" floppy drive's continuously running spindle motor powered directly from AC line voltage. The combined effect of the case fan and the floppy motor results in an extremely noisy computer, compared to the nearly silent Model I/III.

The video display in the Model II is similar to the Model I. A 12" black-and-white television CRT is used; the monitors were supplied by RCA and Motorola. However, the Model II's video circuitry is significantly improved in the interest of better picture quality, as one of the criticisms of the Model I is that the included monitor is an RCA television set with the RF, IF, and sound stripped out. The Model II, in contrast, uses a dedicated monochrome composite monitor with higher-quality and better-adjusted components than the modified TV set provided with the Model I. The text display on the Model II is 80x24 rather than the Model I/III's 64x16 text, and also has lowercase letters, which the Model I originally lacked. In addition, it can be operated in 40x24 text mode. The character set in the Model II is different from the Model I/III. It includes several mathematics and currency symbols, and in place of the Model I/III's semigraphics characters has 30 characters (ASCII codes 128-158) for drawing lines and boxes. Reverse video characters are not available.

The Model II is similar to an S-100 machine in that it has a passive backplane with eight expansion slots; four of these are normally occupied by the CPU card, floppy controller, keyboard/video card, and RAM. A separate PCB in the back of the machine contains two RS-232 ports and a Centronics port. Although the expansion slots look similar to an S-100 slot, they are a proprietary design and cannot be used with S-100 boards.

The graphics expansion board (Radio Shack catalog number 26-4104) supports pixel-addressable graphics with 640 by 240 resolution. It can overlay the text screen with the bitmapped display, and is compatible with the Models 12 and 16. The board came with a modified BASIC providing rudimentary screen drawing capabilities like line, box and circle drawing, shading and filling, a viewport capability, and array transfer between graphics RAM and CPU RAM. Other expansion cards include a hard disk controller, network interface controller, and a Model 16 upgrade board with 68000 CPU that can address up to 256 KB memory.

The Model II architecture supports up to 512K RAM via a bank-switchable upper 32K page segment (up to fifteen 32K pages are supported). However, the machine does not provide enough card slots to physically upgrade the RAM to 512K. This is because RAM was provided via 32K or 64K cards and only a few open card slots are available on a standard Model II, since the basic configuration of the machine uses four slots. This deficiency was rectified with the Model 12, which can accommodate up to 768 KB RAM using the newer 4164 DRAM chips and a revised bank-switching scheme.

A special-purpose expansion card is the 64K Memory Expansion Board (catalog number 26-4105) which allows the Model II (without the expensive Model 16 upgrade) to run Enhanced VisiCalc. This makes available larger worksheets by using banked memory beyond the Z80's base 64 KB.

Some of the technical advances first introduced on the Model II such as the WD 1791 floppy controller and the improved video circuitry appear in the Model III.

Despite being designed primarily for business or operating factory equipment, the Model II does have games available, notably the Scott Adams Adventure series were sold for it. In addition, CP/M versions of Infocom text adventures are compatible.

Tandy offered a desk custom-designed for the Model II for US$370. It can hold an additional three 8″ disk drives or up to four 8.4 MB hard drives (the Model II allows three external floppy drives to be daisy-chained to it). In 1981, the 64K Model II computer was $3,350 and the "primary unit" 8.4 MB hard disk another $4,040 by mail-order from Radio Shack's dealer in Perry, Michigan; MSRP in the company's own stores was higher.

The Model II BASIC also includes a number of additional commands and functions to facilitate file handling and disk operations, such as the DIR command for listing files on a disk and the KILL command for deleting files. The PEEK and POKE commands are not implemented in Model II BASIC, making it less programmer-friendly than Model I/III BASIC.

=== Other programming languages ===
Microsoft made available its Fortran, Cobol and BASIC compilers, as well as its MACRO-80 assembler. All were sold through Radio Shack. Later the simpler, more affordable Series I editor/assembler package from Radio Shack itself, familiar to many Model I hobbyists, was offered for the Model II. Radio Shack also had its own macro assembler product, Assembly Language Development System, or popularly known as ALDS. This product was later reworked and sold for the Model 4.

=== Applications software ===
Wayne Green estimated that sales of the Model II as of August 1982 were about 10% of the Model I, discouraging third-party developers from creating software for the more expensive computer; the small software library, in turn, discouraged sales of the Model II. He described Tandy's software support for the Model II as "less than dynamic", because of the company's focus on the Model III. Tandy produced and marketed various Model II business applications ranging from accounting, medical office, legal office, payroll, inventory, order entry, and sales analysis, to general-purpose applications for word processing, database management, and later spreadsheet work. Some were produced in-house (like the Scripsit word processor), others licensed and branded as Radio Shack products (like the Profile database), and still others marketed by Radio Shack, such as VisiCalc. The company also offered products facilitating data transfer with IBM mainframe computers.

== Model 12 ==
The Model II was replaced in 1982 by the TRS-80 Model 12, which has half-height ("thinline") double-sided floppy drives, and integrates most of the Model II electronics into a single main board. The video and keyboard card plugged into a single slot in the main board. An expansion card cage was available as an option, allowing six more plug-in cards. The white phosphor CRT on the Model II was replaced with a green phosphor tube on the Model 12 for easier viewing and less eye strain. Its keyboard sported eight function keys. The Model 12 is essentially a Model 16B without the card cage and Motorola processor boards, and is upgradable to a Model 16B.

The Model 12 moved the Centronics and serial ports to a cluster on the rear left side of the computer.

== Model 16 ==
The TRS-80 Model 16 came out in February 1982 as the follow-on to the Model II; an upgrade kit was available for Model II systems. The Model 16 added a 6 MHz, 16/32-bit Motorola 68000 processor and memory card, keeping the original Z80 as an I/O processor, or as the main processor when 8-bit Model II software was loaded. It has two half-height ("thinline") double-sided 8-inch floppy drives, though the Model II upgrade does not replace the floppy drive. The Model 16 can run either TRSDOS-16 or TRS-Xenix, a variant of Xenix, Microsoft's version of UNIX. TRSDOS-16 is a TRSDOS II-4.1 application providing a 68000 interface and support for up to three users, with no additional features and little compatible software. 68000 functionality was added as an extension, loading 68000 code into the 68000 memory via a shared memory window with the Z80.

Why is a Model 16 like a bowling ball?

Because you can get the same amount of software for each!

— Joke told at Tandy headquarters

At a price of US$4,999 (equivalent to $16,680 in 2025), the Model 16 sold poorly. By June 1982 the company had shipped 2,000 units to stores, with the majority unsold. Five months after its introduction, the computer still had no TRSDOS-16 applications; owners had to run Model II or CP/M software and applications. Its release forced the few developers of Model II software to "start all over again", Green said, because customers would not want to run Z80 software on the Model 16. Tandy admitted that it should have encouraged third-party software development, which resulted in the killer app VisiCalc for the Apple II. In 1983, VisiCorp produced an update of Visicalc which Tandy sold for the Model 16 called Enhanced VisiCalc. This version runs on the Z80 and uses banked memory beyond the base 64 KB for larger worksheets.

Rumors stated that Tandy would offer Xenix or another third-party operating system for the computer. In early 1983 the company indeed switched to Xenix, and offered it for free to existing customers; by mid-1983 an estimated 5,000 of 30,000 Model 16s ran Xenix. Xenix was based on UNIX System III, also supported up to three users, and was more established.

The Model 16 keyboard was not designed for Unix; ~, |, and \ must be typed as Ctrl characters. Tandy's Jon Shirley said that almost all Xenix systems were using its multiuser capability, as terminals were much less expensive than the Model 16 itself. With Xenix, the Model 16 family became a popular system for small business, with a relatively large library of business and office automation software. Tandy offered multiuser word processing (Scripsit 16), spreadsheet (Multiplan), and a 3GL database (Profile 16, later upgraded to filePro 16+), as well as an accounting suite with optional COBOL source for customization. RM-COBOL, BASIC, and C were available for programming, with Unify and Informix offered as relational databases. A kernel modification kit was also available.

== Model 16B and Tandy 6000 ==
The Model 16 evolved into the TRS-80 Model 16B with 256 KB in July 1983, and later in 1985, the Tandy 6000, gaining an internal hard drive and Arcnet support along the way and switching to an 8 MHz 68000. Tandy offered 8.4 MB, 15 MB, 35 MB, and 70 MB external hard drives, up to 768 KB of RAM, and up to six additional RS-232 serial ports supporting multi-user terminals. An expansion board with 512 KB memory was offered for the 6000, raising the maximum total RAM to one megabyte. Additional memory and serial port expansion options were available from aftermarket companies.

Tandy sold an upgrade from 16 to 6000. The 6000 was referred to simply as the Tandy 6000 due to a marketing decision to move away from the Radio Shack and TRS-80 badges.

The 16B was the most popular Unix computer in 1984, with almost 40,000 units sold. The 6000 came with Xenix and TRSDOS, but very few ran the latter or CP/M; they cannot boot from the hard drive. In 1987, Tandy announced that the 6000 hardware would no longer be improved; customers believed that their systems had become orphaned technology. By 1988, Radio Shack had begun offering IBM-compatible 386 PCs for their professional line and finally retired the Model II family.

== Reception ==
InfoWorld in 1981 called the Model II "a well-designed, capable business system" that "overcomes several limitations of the Model I". Creative Computing in 1984 called it a "state-of-the-art business machine" that "might have taken the business market by storm had it not had a nameplate reading 'Radio Shack.'"

80 Micro in 1982 described the Model 12 as "not a major innovation, but an evolutionary" variant. The magazine said that fixed most Model II flaws, except the "aged" Z80A CPU and "excessive noise [that] still holds many owners in acoustical purgatory". Noting that a Model 12 with expansion box and Model 16 upgrade supports more RAM and had two more empty slots than a native Model 16, 80 Micro wondered "Why then would anyone want to buy the Model 16?". Describing the Model 12 as "a refined" Model II, InfoWorld in 1983 said that its expandability made it "a real contender in the business market", and approved of its documentation. The magazine advised users to use an alternative operating system because of TRSDOS's poor performance, design, and compatibility. Citing its "large existing base of software", InfoWorld concluded that the Model 12 "is a solid, well-conceived business computer [that] lacks only a viable operating system to be used as a serious program-development tool".

BYTE in January 1984 stated that "the Model 16B is a fairly well-implemented and apparently well-supported Xenix system" that would likely receive much support from software developers. The reviewers said that it greatly improved on the Model I and III, and surprised them by being a very good small Unix development system. While criticizing Xenix's user unfriendliness for small business customers, and wondering "whether Radio Shack can or will invest" in training on the very sophisticated operating system for its dealers, they concluded that the Model 16B "deserves serious consideration". The magazine in August 1984 described the 16B as "a usable multiuser microcomputer system", but with a slow hard drive that might limit the computer to two users. UnixWorld in 1985 estimated that Tandy had sold 50,000 Xenix-capable computers during 1982 to 1984, or "about 55 units per store per year-not bad, but hardly a smashing success".
