= Electric Pencil =

1976 microcomputer word processor program

- Developer: Michael Shrayer (b. 1934 – d. 2006)
- Release: 1976; 50 years ago
- Operating system: MITS Altair, Sol-20, TRS-80, IBM PC
- Type: Word processor

Electric Pencil, released in December 1976 by Michael Shrayer, was the first word processor program for home computers.

Despite its initial market dominance, alternatives like WordStar and Magic Wand surpassed its popularity some time later.

== History ==
In 1975, Michael Shrayer moved to California after 20 years as a New York filmmaker. He purchased and assembled a MITS Altair 8800 computer, then modified a public domain assembler program for the Processor Technology Sol-20. Fellow computer hobbyists asked to buy Shrayer's ESP-1 software, leading him to sell it as a commercial product.

Having never heard of a "word processor", Shrayer nonetheless believed that he should be able to use his computer, instead of a typewriter, to write documentation for his program, and thus wrote another program – the first word processor for a microcomputer – with which to do so. Electric Pencil for the Altair appeared in December 1976, and the version for the Sol-20 became especially popular. As no large network of computer stores existed, Shrayer formed Michael Shrayer Software Inc. – a company name he regretted, as it cost him his privacy – advertised in computer magazines such as BYTE, and sold the program via mail order. Electric Pencil required 8K of memory and an Intel 8080 or Zilog Z80 processor. As customers requested the program for their specific computers and operating systems he ported the word processor to each, resulting in 78 versions including the NorthStar Horizon and TRS-80.

Electric Pencil was the first program for microcomputers to implement a basic feature of word processors: word wrap, in which lines are adjusted as words are inserted and deleted.

Electric Pencil's market dominance might have continued had Shrayer continued to update it. Many imitators appeared, however, including WordStar and Magic Wand, both of which surpassed the original's popularity as Shrayer became bored with programming and sold its rights to others. Electric Pencil remained on the market into the 1980s, including a version for the IBM PC in 1983.

== Reception ==
James Fallows in 1982 described Electric Pencil as "outdated and crude" compared to newer products like Perfect Writer and Scripsit.

Rating it as "Good" in all categories, InfoWorld in 1984 approved of the $450 IBM PC version's ease of use, speed, undo, and lack of copy protection, but criticized the developer's refusal to upgrade the software.

"It's amazing how much $49.95 will buy", PC Magazine said of Electric Pencil in a 1987 review of low-cost word processors for the IBM PC. The magazine approved of its speed and power, including complete reprogrammability of the keyboard. PC concluded that Electric Pencil "is not for beginners but for those who want a powerful word processor that they can grow with, without paying a lot for it".

== Notable use ==
Jerry Pournelle is recognized as the first author to have written a published portion of a book using a word processor on a personal computer, using Electric Pencil for that purpose. In 1977, Pournelle was shown the program and decided it would help his productivity by making it easier to produce a final manuscript without requiring a complete retyping of edited pages.
