= Bill Stewart (programmer) =

American software developer

William C. "Bill" Stewart (1950 – August 2009) was an American computer programmer.

Stewart was born in Memphis, Tennessee. He founded Stewart Software Company there in 1984 and marketed Zilog Z80 assembly language programs, notably TOOLKIT and the ONLINE 80 Bulletin Board System, for Radio Shack TRS-80 Computers running TRSDOS. Later that company became Stewart Computer & Supply, Inc. Switching to 8088 Assembly under IBM PC DOS and MS-DOS, it released programs via shareware and commercial distribution.

His shareware FREE.COM was cited as a top 10 PC utility in PC Magazine in 1987.

His commercial programs were oriented towards MS-DOS computer servicing and diagnostics. Commercial products included UNIFORM, a non-destructive reformat for hard drives, CSR, which allowed service shops to archive CMOS settings from computers they serviced and restore them, and Rx, a small terminate-and-stay-resident program (TSR) which gave plain English explanations to accompany the often cryptic "Abort, Retry or Ignore?" errors generated by DOS by changing it to "Abort, Retry, Ignore or Explain?".

Stewart Computer & Supply, Inc was sold in 1993 and Stewart moved to Fort Myers, Florida where he continued to write computer diagnostic software for 8088-based machines until 1997, and was a frequent contributor to The PC Troubleshooter magazine.

Later he lived in Cape Coral, Florida where he was a ham radio operator, call sign N4CRO, a scuba diver and an amateur weather enthusiast. From 1994 he worked in law enforcement.

Stewart died in August 2009 at the age of 59.
