= TRS-80 Model 4 =

1983 personal computer

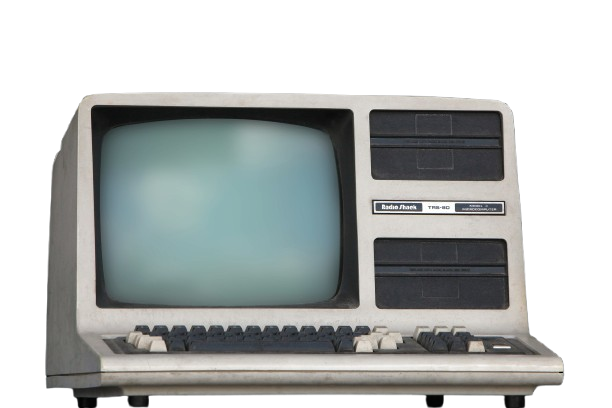
- Manufacturer: Tandy Corporation
- Type: Home and small business computer
- Released: April 26, 1983; 43 years ago
- Introductory price: $1999 (64K, 2 floppy drives, RS-232C), $1699 (64K, 1 floppy drive, no RS-232C)
- Discontinued: Late 1991
- Operating system: TRSDOS 6.2, LS-DOS 6.3, TRSDOS 1.3, LDOS 5.3, CP/M 2.2 or 3.0
- CPU: Zilog Z80A @ 4 MHz
- Memory: 64 KB or 128 KB, 1 MB plus with third-party upgrades
- Display: Model 4 mode: 24 rows, 80 or 40 columns, Model III mode: 16 rows, 64 or 32 columns, block graphics
- Graphics: optional 640 by 240 pixels for $249 extra
- Sound: beeper
- Backward compatibility: TRS-80 Model III
- Predecessor: TRS-80 Model III
- Successor: none

The TRS-80 Model 4 is the last Z80-based home computer family by Radio Shack, sold from April 1983 through late 1991.

== Model 4 ==
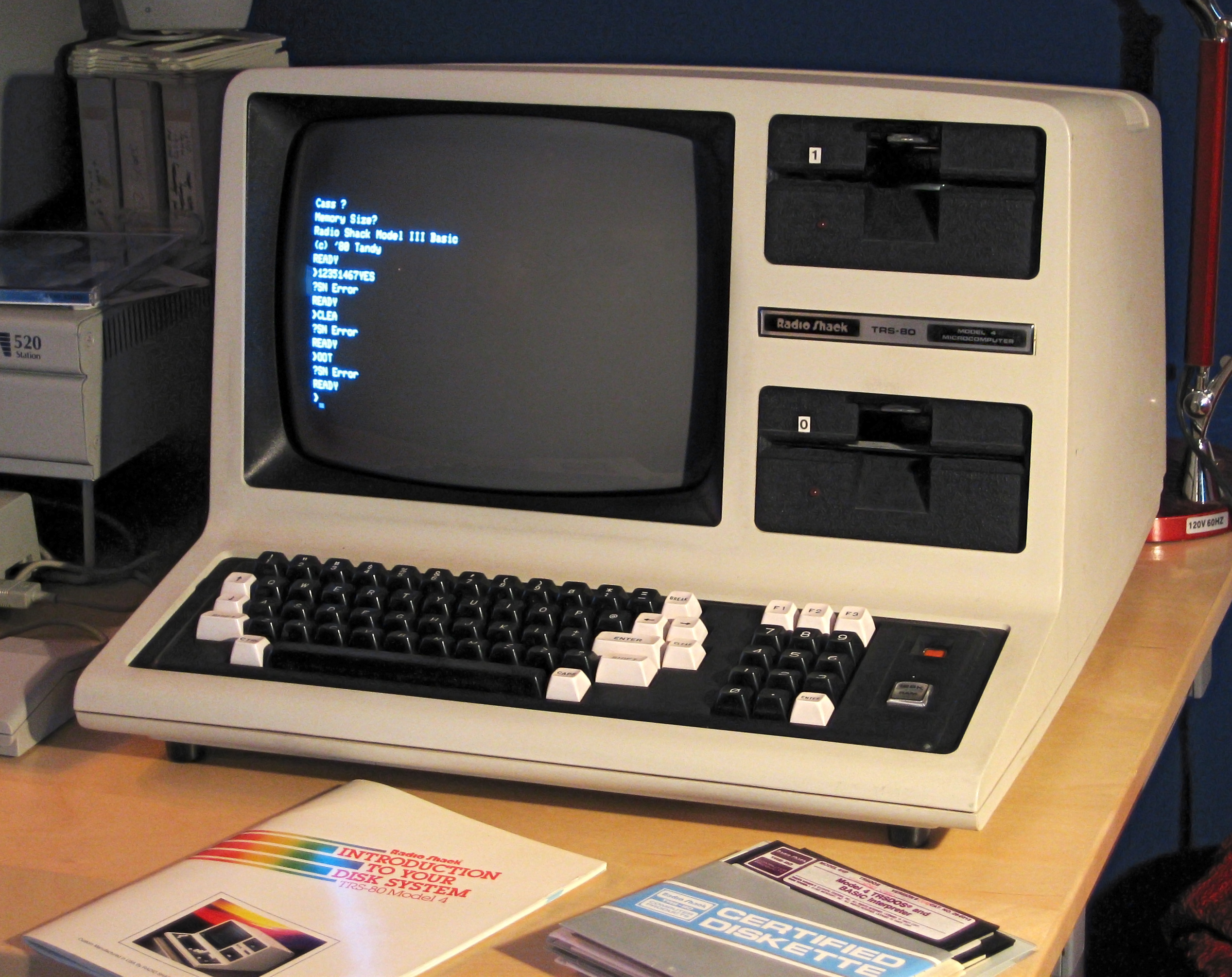
TRS-80 Model 4, 1983 non-gate array version

Tandy Corporation introduced the TRS-80 Model 4 on April 26, 1983 as the successor to the TRS-80 Model III. The Model 4 has a faster Z80A 4 MHz CPU, larger video display of 80 columns by 24 rows, bigger keyboard, and can be upgraded to 128KB of RAM. It is compatible with Model III software and CP/M application software. The Model 4 was announced in the same April 1983 press release as was the TRS-80 Model 100 laptop. The two computers were often marketed by Tandy/Radio Shack as a complementary pair.

A diskless Model 4 with a 64x16 (rather than 80x24) display, 16KB RAM and no RS-232C port cost $999 (later reduced to $799). Despite being branded a Model 4, it could (unless upgraded) only run Model I and Model III programs via cassette or manual type-in.

The Model 4 with 64KB RAM and one single-sided 180K disk drive cost $1699; with 64KB RAM, two drives, and an RS-232C board and port it cost $1999. An upgrade for Model III owners cost $799 and provided a new motherboard and keyboard.

The Model 4's first appearance in the Radio Shack catalog stated: "Yes, it looks like a Model III, but it's much much more. Compare the price and features of our amazing new Model 4 to any other computer in its class. You'll find that for power, versatility, and convenience it is a true breakthrough. To add the same features to other computers, you'd have to pay a whole lot more." Commenting on its unexpected longevity as a Radio Shack product and object of aftermarket support by third-party companies, in May 1987 80 Micro magazine remarked, "Even when it was introduced in 1983, the Model 4 was seen as a last gasp for the TRS-80 line."

=== Overview ===
The computer has the same all-in-one cabinet as the Model III, adopting a more contemporary-looking beige color scheme instead of the black and gray used on the Models I/III. The Model 4 uses WD1770/1773 floppy controllers instead of the WD1791, which allows for a larger gap between the index hole and first sector; later releases of TRSDOS and LDOS were modified for compatibility with the controller.

The Model 4 shipped with TRSDOS 6, identical to Logical Systems's LDOS 6.00 third-party operating system (itself an enhancement to older versions of TRSDOS). When the Model 4 boots into TRSDOS 6, the video display switches into 80×24 mode and the entire 64KB address space is mapped as RAM.

Misosys Inc. sold a Model 4 Hardware Interface Kit which enables the extra keys on the Model 4 keyboard, and in a 128 KB Model 4, the banked memory. Intellitech sold a program called Supermod4 that allows Model III programs running on a Model 4 to activate the 4 megahertz CPU clock, larger video display, the speaker and the function keys. In August 1985 80 Micro magazine published a DoubleDuty-like task switching program that activates the external RAM banks on a 128 KB Model 4 from within Model III mode.

The Model 4 can run CP/M without modification, unlike the Model I and III. Digital Research produced a version of CP/M 3.0 for the Model 4. Montezuma Micro sold a version of CP/M 2.2 that was customized for the Model 4's hardware: banked RAM, reverse video and assignable codes for the function keys. It has a utility for reading and writing CP/M disk formats of many other brands of computer. Montezuma sold a terminate-and-stay-resident program they called Monte's Window, which provides functionality similar to Borland Sidekick. Its code resided entirely in the banked RAM of a 128K Model 4; no user memory was occupied.

DoubleDuty was made only for the Model 4, marketed by Radio Shack. This is one of the first task-switching programs available for a microcomputer. It uses the upper 64KB of a 128KB machine to keep resident a second TRSDOS application, which can be switched instantly with another application loaded into the main 64KB. A third partition is available for TRSDOS library commands, such as DIR. DoubleDuty first appeared in Radio Shack's 1985 Computer Catalog (RSC-12), the same year that IBM's Topview, Apple's Switcher, and Quarterdeck's DESQview first became available. DoubleDuty was written by Randy Cook, the author of the first version of TRSDOS for the original Model I.

Early versions of the Model 4 mainboard were designed to accept a Zilog Z800 16 bit CPU upgrade board to replace the Z80 8 bit CPU but this option was never released. In 1987 H.I. Tech produced an enhanced CPU board, the XLR8er, using the Hitachi HD64180 Z80-compatible processor.

=== Reception ===
Tandy sold 71,000 Model 4 computers in 1984. BYTE in October 1983 noted the lack of native software, but praised the Model 4's backwards compatibility and TRSDOS 6's new features. The magazine concluded that the Model 4 "provides a lot of flexible computing power ... Radio Shack has a guaranteed winner". Creative Computing chose the Model 4 as the best desktop computer under $2000 for 1984, stating that the $1299 price for a system with two disk drives was "a real bargain".

== Gate Array Model 4 ==
The original version of the Model 4 (Radio Shack catalog number 26-1069) does not use gate array logic chips on its CPU board, but rather Programmable Array Logic chips (PALs). Starting from late 1984, a revised version was produced which came to be known as the Gate Array Model 4 (catalog number 26-1069A). This change greatly reduced the chip count and allows the circuitry for the floppy disk controller and the RS-232 serial port to be included on the CPU board, making this new Model 4 a single-board computer, unlike the original 26-1069.

The Gate Array version 26-1069A can be distinguished from the older version by its green CRT screen (with greater contrast than the black-and-white CRT) and its four arrow keys grouped in a single cluster (the older version had two arrow keys on each side of its keyboard). The RS-232C serial port of the Gate Array version has its DB-25 connector pointing out the back of the computer's cabinet rather than down at the surface the computer is resting on, which made connection of a serial cable much easier. A Gate Array machine can be upgraded to 128 KB of RAM with industry standard 4161 DRAM chips, not requiring a special PAL chip available only from Radio Shack. The new version runs its Z80 processor at a true clock rate of 4 MHz without wait states, which gave the older version an effective clock rate of about 3.5 MHz.

== Model 4P ==
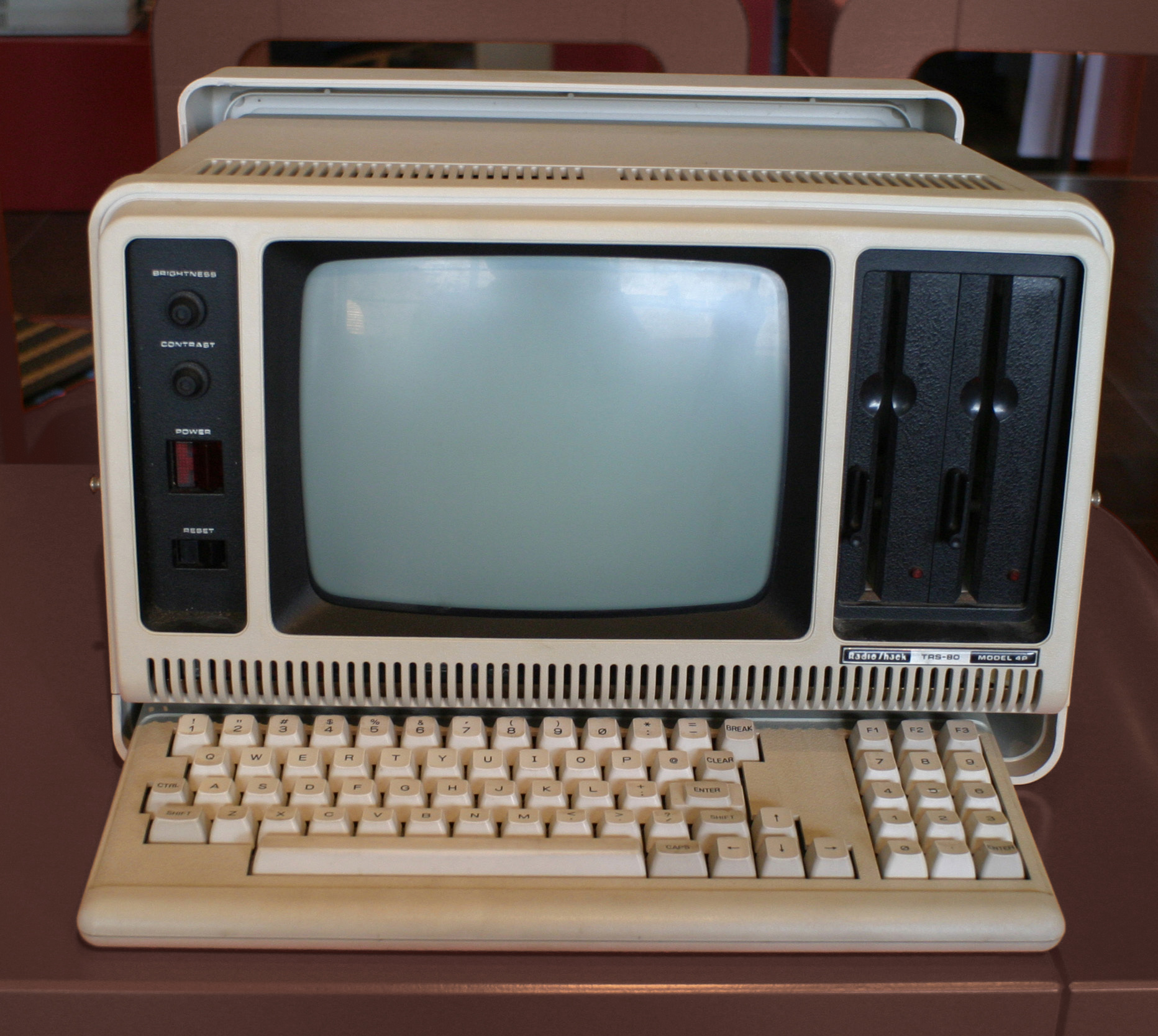
TRS-80 Model 4P

The Model 4P (September 1983, Radio Shack catalog number 26-1080) is a self-contained luggable unit. It has all the features of the desktop Model 4 except for the ability to add two outboard floppy disk drives and the interface for cassette tape storage (audio sent to the cassette port in Model III mode goes to the internal speaker). It was sold with the two internal single-sided 180 KB drives. It was later made with the Gate Array technology (catalog number 26-1080A). 80 Micro published an article describing a simple motherboard modification to enable the installation of two external floppy drives.

The 4P's video monitor is 9" compared to the Model 4's 12". The smaller size, and sharper dots, produce better video output. The computer is compatible with popular internal Model 4 peripherals, and has a slot for an internal modem board. The Radio Shack modem uses its own proprietary command set and only supports communications at 300 baud. Teletrends produced a 1200 baud that uses the Hayes command set.

Tandy discontinued the 4P by early 1985, stating that "even though you won't find a more enthusiastic and devoted group of owners than our Model 4P folks, transportables just weren't moving well for any company that also sold a desktop version."

=== Reception ===
InfoWorld in 1983 predicted that the 4P would be a "smashing success" as a "substantial improvement" on the Model 4's video and keyboard. The magazine said that it was "truly a transportable computer" and approved of the "carefully thought-out mechanical design", not too large or small. Although criticizing the computer's lack of advanced documentation or double-sided drives, InfoWorld concluded that the 4P "is an outstanding product at an excellent price".

== Model 4D ==
The final version of the Model 4 is the Model 4D (Radio Shack catalog number 26-1070), first sold in 1985. It is a Gate Array desktop machine featuring dual TEC FB-503 disk drives with a capacity of 360KB each (double density sectors, 40 track, double-sided). Rather than using a lever-style latch as had previous Model 4 drives, these drives use a twist-style latch that provides for more reliable clamping. They are half-height drives mounted with full-height faceplates.

The DeskMate productivity suite is bundled with the 4D. It supplies simple applications including a word processor, filer, spreadsheet, calendar, and mail manager.

Later Misosys, Inc. updated LS-DOS 6.3 to support dates through December 31, 2011 (as well as a few other enhancements). The Model III LDOS 5.1.4 was also updated to version 5.3, supporting the same feature set as LS-DOS 6.3.

The Model 4D is the last computer descended from Radio Shack's original Model I from 1977 but it is not branded as a Radio Shack product. The badge mounted on its front cover brands it as the "Tandy TRS-80 Model 4D". This change in marketing resulted from Tandy corporation's desire to enhance its stature in the marketplace, because it was perceived by some in the computer press that the old "Radio Shack" moniker connoted an image of inferior quality. The Model 4D is the last computer to bear the "TRS-80" name. It retailed for $1199 at its introduction in 1985. During 1987–1988 the retail stores removed the Model 4Ds from display but they were kept in the yearly computer catalog and were available by special order through 1991, when they were closed out for $599. Parts and repair service remained available for several years longer.
