= TRS-80 =

1977 microcomputer by Tandy Corporation

TRS-80 Model I

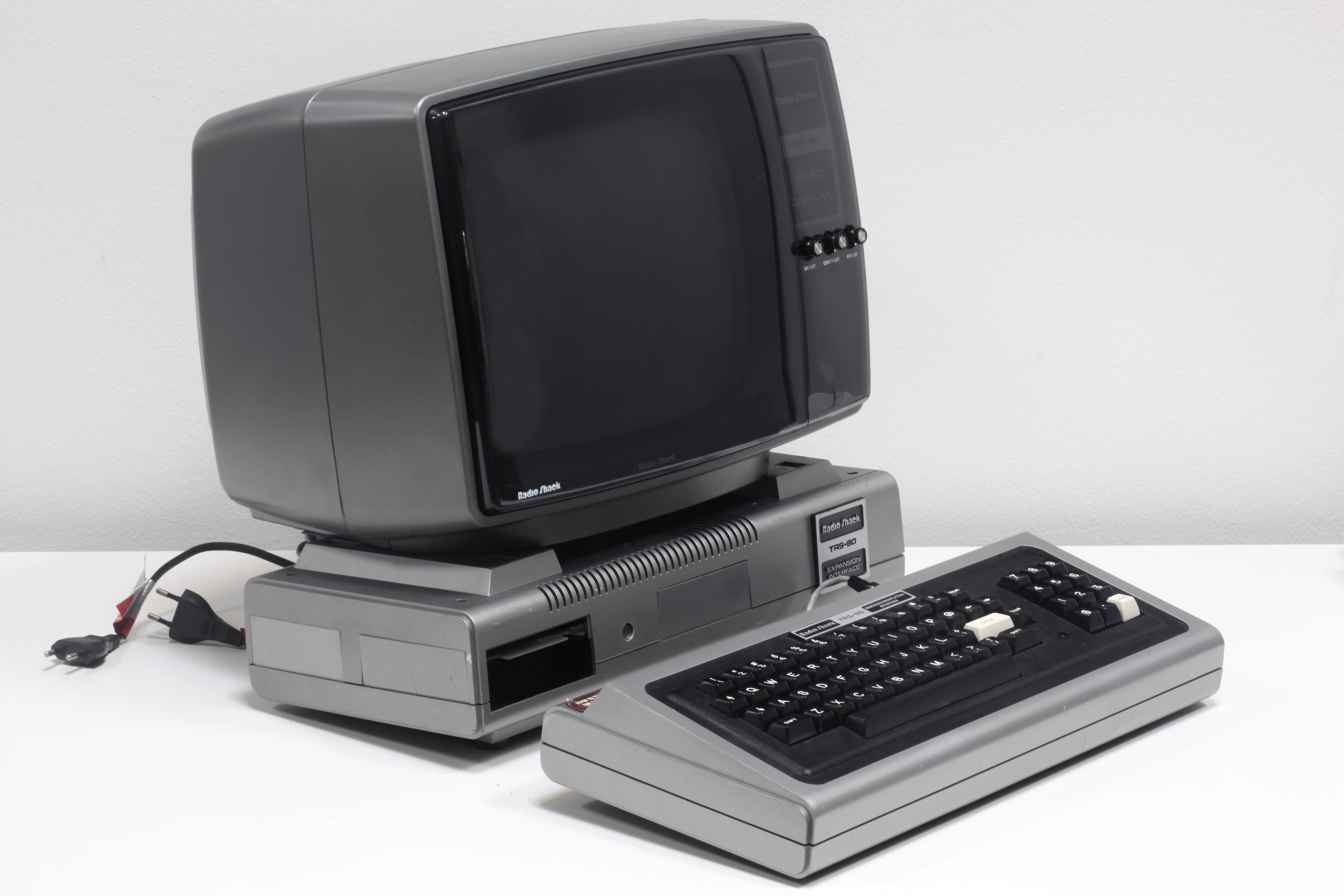
- TRS-80 Model I with Expansion Interface and display
- Manufacturer: Tandy Corporation
- Type: Home computer
- Released: August 3, 1977; 49 years ago
- Lifespan: 1977–1981
- Introductory price: US$599.95 (equivalent to $3,190 in 2025)
- Discontinued: January 1981; 45 years ago
- Units sold: >100,000 (as of 1979); 2.4 million (all models)
- Operating system: TRSDOS, LDOS, NewDos/80, Level I BASIC
- CPU: Zilog Z80 @ 1.774 MHz
- Memory: 4–48 KB
- Display: Monochrome 12" CRT, 64 × 16 character semigraphics
- Sound: Square wave tones

The TRS-80 Micro Computer System (TRS-80, colloquially known as the "Trash-80", later renamed the TRS-80 Model I to distinguish it from its successors) is a desktop microcomputer developed by American company Tandy Corporation and sold through their Radio Shack stores. Launched in 1977, it is one of the earliest mass-produced and mass-marketed retail home computers. The name is derived from Tandy Radio Shack Z80, referring to its Zilog Z80 8-bit microprocessor.

The TRS-80 has a full-stroke QWERTY keyboard, 4 KB DRAM standard memory, small size and desk area, floating-point Level I BASIC language interpreter in ROM, 64-character-per-line video monitor, and had a starting price of US$600 (equivalent to US$3,200 in 2025). A cassette tape drive for program storage was included in the original package. While the software environment was stable, the cassette load/save process combined with keyboard bounce issues and a troublesome Expansion Interface contributed to the Model I's reputation as not well-suited for serious use. Initially (until 1981), it lacked support for lowercase characters which may have hampered business adoption. An extensive line of upgrades and peripherals for the TRS-80 were developed and marketed by Tandy/Radio Shack. The basic system can be expanded with up to 48 KB of RAM, and up to four floppy disk drives and/or hard disk drives. Tandy/Radio Shack provided full-service support including upgrade, repair, and training services in their thousands of stores worldwide.

By 1979, the TRS-80 had the largest selection of software in the microcomputer market. Until 1982, the TRS-80 was the bestselling PC line, outselling the Apple II by a factor of five according to one analysis. The broadly compatible TRS-80 Model III was released in the middle of 1980. The Model I was discontinued shortly thereafter, primarily due to stricter US FCC regulations on radio-frequency interference. In April 1983, the Model III was succeeded by the compatible TRS-80 Model 4.

Following the original Model I and its compatible descendants, the TRS-80 name became a generic brand used on other unrelated computer lines sold by Tandy, including the TRS-80 Model II, TRS-80 Model 2000, TRS-80 Model 100, TRS-80 Color Computer, and TRS-80 Pocket Computer.

== History ==
=== Development ===
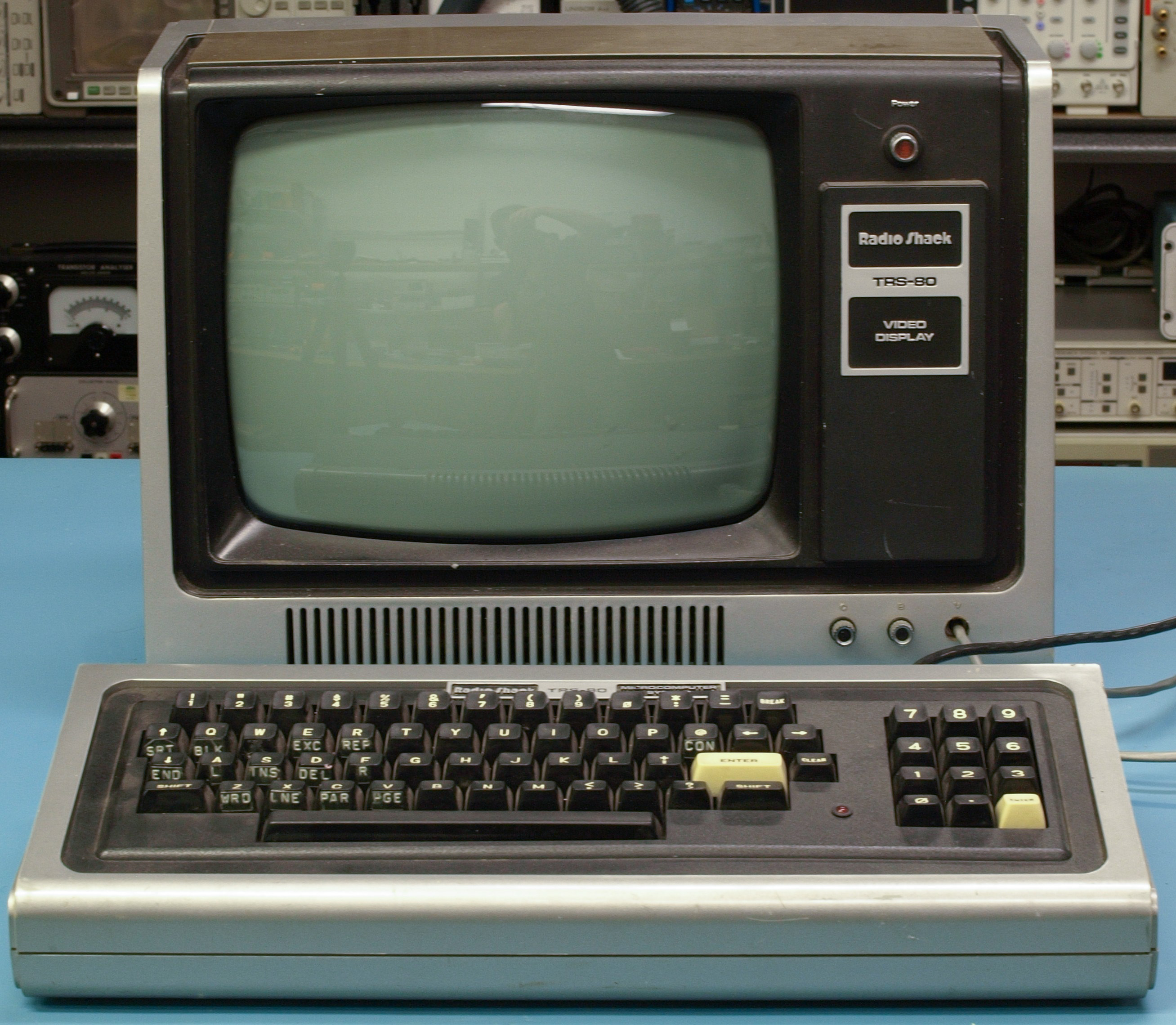
Tandy/Radio Shack TRS-80 Model I

In the mid-1970s, Tandy Corporation's Radio Shack division was a successful American chain of more than 3,000 electronics stores. Among the Tandy employees who purchased a MITS Altair kit computer was buyer Don French, who began designing his own computer and showed it to the vice president of manufacturing John V. Roach, Tandy's former electronic data processing manager. Although the design did not impress Roach, the idea of selling a microcomputer did. When the two men visited National Semiconductor in California in mid-1976, Homebrew Computer Club member Steve Leininger's expertise on the SC/MP microprocessor impressed them. National executives refused to provide Leininger's contact information when French and Roach wanted to hire him as a consultant, but they found Leininger working part-time at Byte Shop. Leininger was unhappy at National, his wife wanted a better job, and Texas did not have a state income tax. Hired for his technical and retail experience, Leininger began working with French in June 1976. The company envisioned a kit, but Leininger persuaded the others that because "too many people can't solder", a preassembled computer would be better.

Tandy had 11 million customers that might buy a microcomputer, but it would be much more expensive than the US$30 median price of a Radio Shack product, and a great risk for the very conservative company. Executives feared losing money as Sears did with Cartrivision, and many opposed the project; one executive told French, "Don't waste my time—we can't sell computers." As the popularity of CB radio—at one point comprising more than 20% of Radio Shack's sales—declined, however, the company sought new products. In December 1976 French and Leininger received official approval for the project but were told to emphasize cost savings; for example, leaving out lowercase characters saved US$1.50 in components and reduced the retail price by US$5. The original US$199 retail price required manufacturing cost of US$80; the first design had a membrane keyboard and no video monitor. Leininger persuaded Roach and French to include a better keyboard, a monitor, datacassette storage, and other features requiring a higher retail price to provide Tandy's typical profit margin. In February 1977 they showed their prototype, running a simple tax-accounting program, to Charles Tandy, head of Tandy Corporation. The program quickly crashed as the computer's implementation of Tiny BASIC could not handle the US$150,000 figure that Tandy typed in as his salary, and the two men added support for floating-point math to its Level I BASIC to prevent a recurrence. The project was formally approved on February 2, 1977; Tandy revealed that he had already leaked the computer's existence to the press. When first inspecting the prototype, he remarked that even if it did not sell, the project could be worthy if only for the publicity it might generate.

MITS sold 1,000 Altairs in February 1975 and was selling 10,000 a year. When Charles Tandy asked who would buy the computer, company president Lewis Kornfeld admitted that they did not know if anyone would, but suggested that small businesses and schools might. Knowing that demand was very strong for the US$795 Altair—which cost more than $1,000 with a monitor—Leininger suggested that Radio Shack could sell 50,000 computers, but no one else believed him; Kornfeld said "If I gave one of these to my wife for Christmas, she'd think I was some kind of nut", and Roach called the figure "horseshit", as the company had never sold that many of anything at that price. Roach and Kornfeld suggested 1,000 to 3,000 per year; 3,000 was the quantity the company would have to produce to buy the components in bulk. Roach persuaded Tandy to agree to build 3,500—the number of Radio Shack stores—so that each store could use a computer for inventory purposes if they did not sell. RCA agreed to supply the video monitor—a black-and-white television with the tuner and speakers removed—after others refused because of Tandy's low initial volume of production. Tandy used the black-and-silver colors of the RCA CRT unit's cabinet for the TRS-80 units as well.

=== Announcement ===
Having spent less than US$150,000 on development, Radio Shack announced the TRS-80 (Tandy Radio Shack) at a New York City press conference on August 3, 1977. It cost US$399 (equivalent to $2,100 in 2025), or US$599 (equivalent to $3,200 in 2025) with a 12-inch (300 mm) monitor and a Radio Shack tape recorder; the most expensive product Radio Shack previously sold was a US$500 stereo. The company hoped that the new computer would help Radio Shack sell higher-priced products, and improve its "schlocky" image among customers. Small businesses were the primary target market, followed by educators, then consumers and hobbyists; despite its hobbyist customer base, Radio Shack saw them as "not the mainstream of the business" and "never our large market".

Although the press conference did not receive much media attention because of a terrorist bombing elsewhere in the city, the computer received much more publicity at Boston University's Personal computer Fair two days later. A front-page Associated Press article discussed the novelty of a large consumer-electronics company selling a home computer that could "do a payroll for up to 15 people in a small business, teach children mathematics, store your favorite recipes or keep track of an investment portfolio. It can also play cards." Six sacks of mail arrived at Tandy headquarters asking about the computer, over 15,000 people called to purchase a TRS-80—paralyzing the company switchboard—and 250,000 joined the waiting list with a $100 deposit.

Despite the internal skepticism, Radio Shack aggressively entered the market. The company advertised "The $599 personal computer" as "the most important, useful, exciting, electronic product of our time". Kornfeld stated when announcing the TRS-80, "This device is inevitably in the future of everyone in the civilized world—in some way—now and so far as ahead as one can think", and Tandy's 1977 annual report called the computer "probably the most important product we've ever built in a company factory". Unlike competitor Commodore—which had announced the PET several months earlier but had not yet shipped any—Tandy had its own factories (capable of producing 18,000 computers a month) and distribution network, and even small towns had Radio Shack stores. The company announced plans to be selling by Christmas a range of peripherals and software for the TRS-80, began shipping computers by September, opened its first computer-only store in October, and delivered 5,000 computers to customers by December. Still forecasting 3,000 sales a year, Radio Shack sold over 10,000 TRS-80s in its first one and a half months of sales, 55,000 in its first year, and over 200,000 during the product's lifetime; one entered the Smithsonian's National Museum of American History.

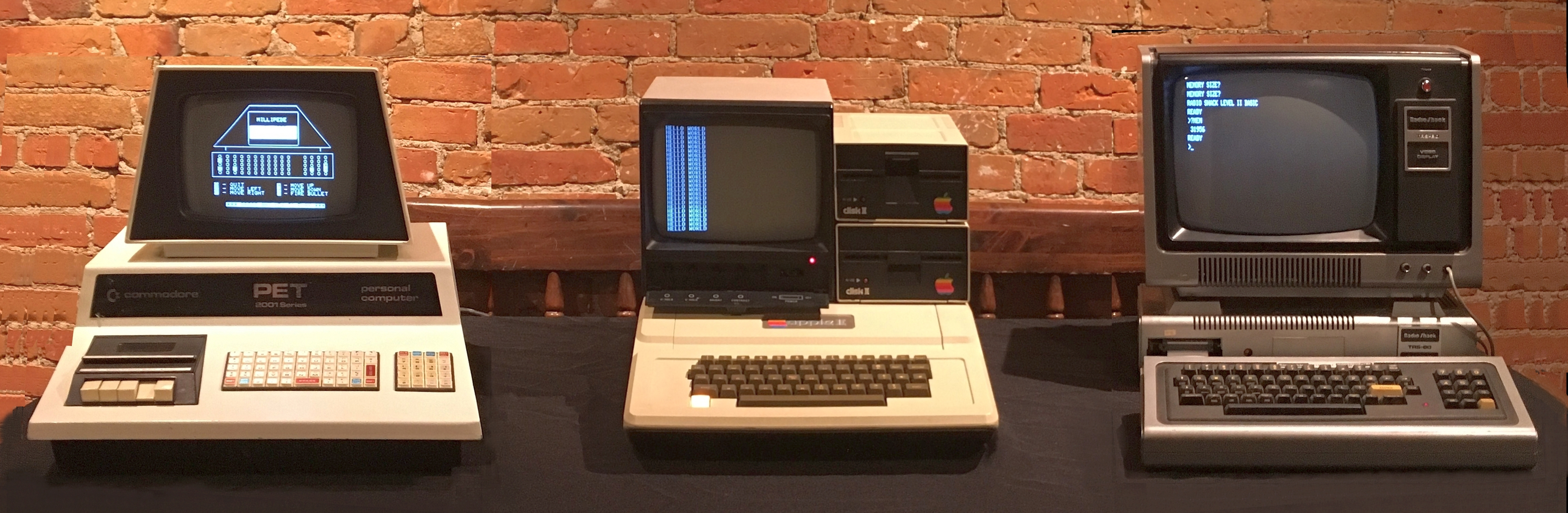
Byte's "1977 trinity": Commodore PET, Apple II, and TRS-80 Model I

=== Delivery ===
The first units, ordered unseen, were delivered in November 1977, and rolled out to the stores the third week of December. The line won popularity with hobbyists, home users, and small businesses. Tandy Corporation's leading position in what Byte magazine called the "1977 Trinity" (Apple Computer, Commodore, and Tandy) had much to do with Tandy's retailing the computer through more than 3,000 of its Radio Shack storefronts in the USA. Tandy claimed it had "7000 [Radio Shack] stores in 40 countries". The pre-release price for the basic system (CPU/keyboard and video monitor) was US$500 and a US$50 deposit was required, with a money-back guarantee at time of delivery.

By mid-1978 the waits of two months or more for delivery were over, and the company could state in advertisements that TRS-80 was "on demonstration and available from stock now at every Radio Shack store in this community!" Tandy/Radio Shack by then promoted itself as "The Biggest Name in Little Computers". More than 1000 people attended a Radio Shack presentation at the Sheraton-Plaza Hotel in Boston, one of 26 such events held around the country. By 1979 1,600 employees built computers in six factories. Kilobaud Microcomputing estimated in 1980 that Tandy was selling three times as many computers as Apple Computer, with both companies ahead of Commodore. By 1981, InfoWorld described Radio Shack as "the dominant supplier of small computers". Hundreds of small companies produced TRS-80 software and accessories, and Adam Osborne described Tandy as "the number-one microcomputer manufacturer" despite having "so few roots in microcomputing". That year Leininger left his job as director for advanced research; French had left to found a software company, after the company rejected his proposal for a Tandy Computer Center to sell non-Tandy computers. The company's computer success helped Roach become Tandy's CEO. Selling computers did not change the company's "schlocky" image; the Radio Shack name embarrassed business customers, and Tandy executives disliked the "Trash-80" nickname for its products. By 1984, computers accounted for 35% of sales, however, and the company had 500 Tandy Radio Shack Computer Centers.

=== Model II and III ===
By 1979, when Radio Shack launched the business-oriented, and incompatible, TRS-80 Model II, the TRS-80 was officially renamed the TRS-80 Model I to distinguish the two product lines.

After some exhibitors at the 1979 Northeast Computer Show were forced to clarify that their products bearing the TRS-80 name were not affiliated with Radio Shack, publications and advertisers briefly began to use "S-80" generically rather than "TRS-80" under scare of legal action, though this never materialized.

Following the Model III launch in mid-1980, Tandy stated that the Model I was still sold, but it was discontinued by the end of the year. Tandy cited one of the main reasons as being the prohibitive cost of redesigning it to meet stricter FCC regulations covering the significant levels of radio-frequency interference emitted by the original design. The Model I radiates so much interference that, while playing games, an AM radio placed next to the computer can be used to provide sounds. Radio Shack offered upgrades, such as a hard drive and numeric keypad, as late as its 1984 catalog.

== Hardware ==
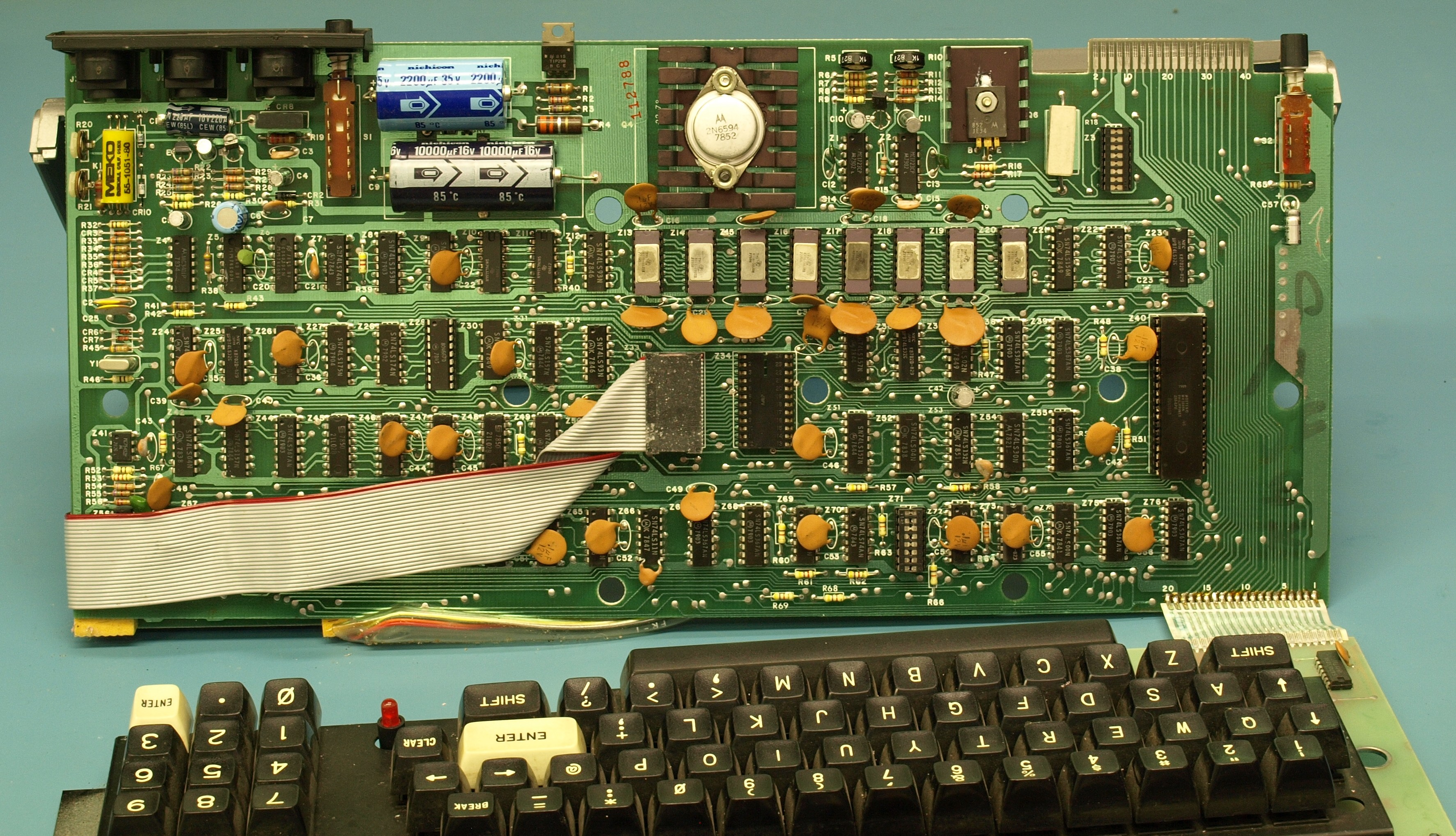
Tandy/Radio Shack TRS‑80 Model I PCB

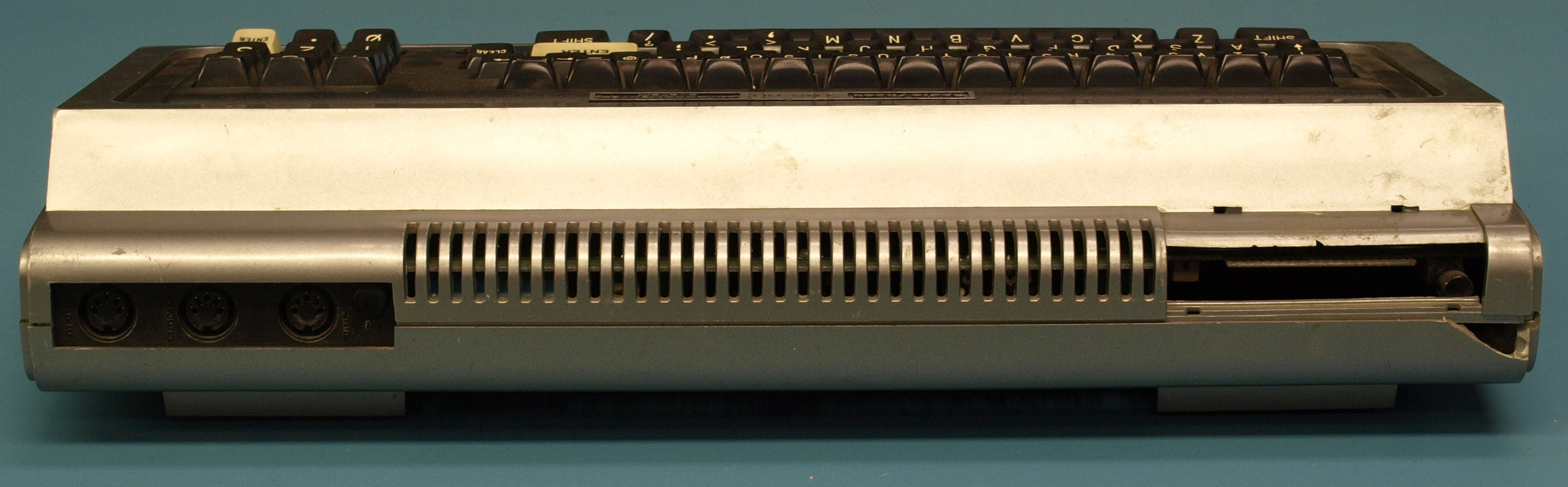
Tandy/Radio Shack TRS‑80 Model I rear-panel connectors

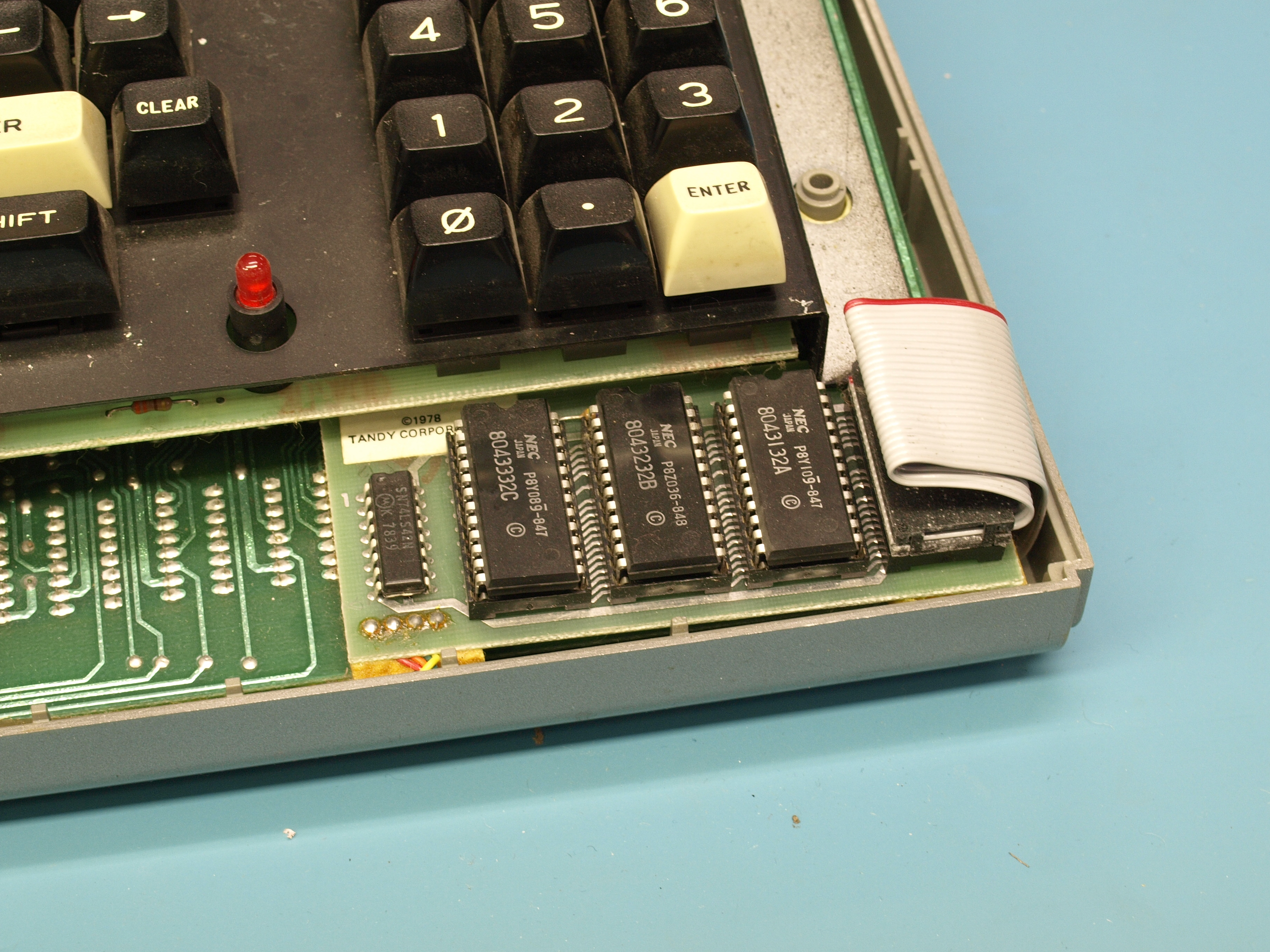
Tandy/Radio Shack TRS‑80 Model I Level II ROM Upgrade PCB

The Model I combines the mainboard and keyboard into one unit, which became a design trend in the 8-bit microcomputer era, although the Model I has a separate power supply unit. It uses a Zilog Z80 processor clocked at 1.78 MHz (later models shipped with a Z80A). The initial Level I machines shipped in late 1977-early 1978 have only 4 KB of RAM. After the Expansion Interface and Level II BASIC were introduced in mid-1978, RAM configurations of 16 KB and up were offered (the first 16 KB was in the Model I itself and the remaining RAM in the Expansion Interface).

The OS ROMs, I/O area, video memory, and OS work space occupy the first 16 KB of memory space on the Model I. The remaining 48 KB of the 64 KB memory map space is available for program use, subject to the amount of physical RAM installed. Although the Z80 CPU can use port-based I/O, the Model I's I/O is memory-mapped aside from the cassette tape and RS-232 serial ports.

=== Keyboard ===
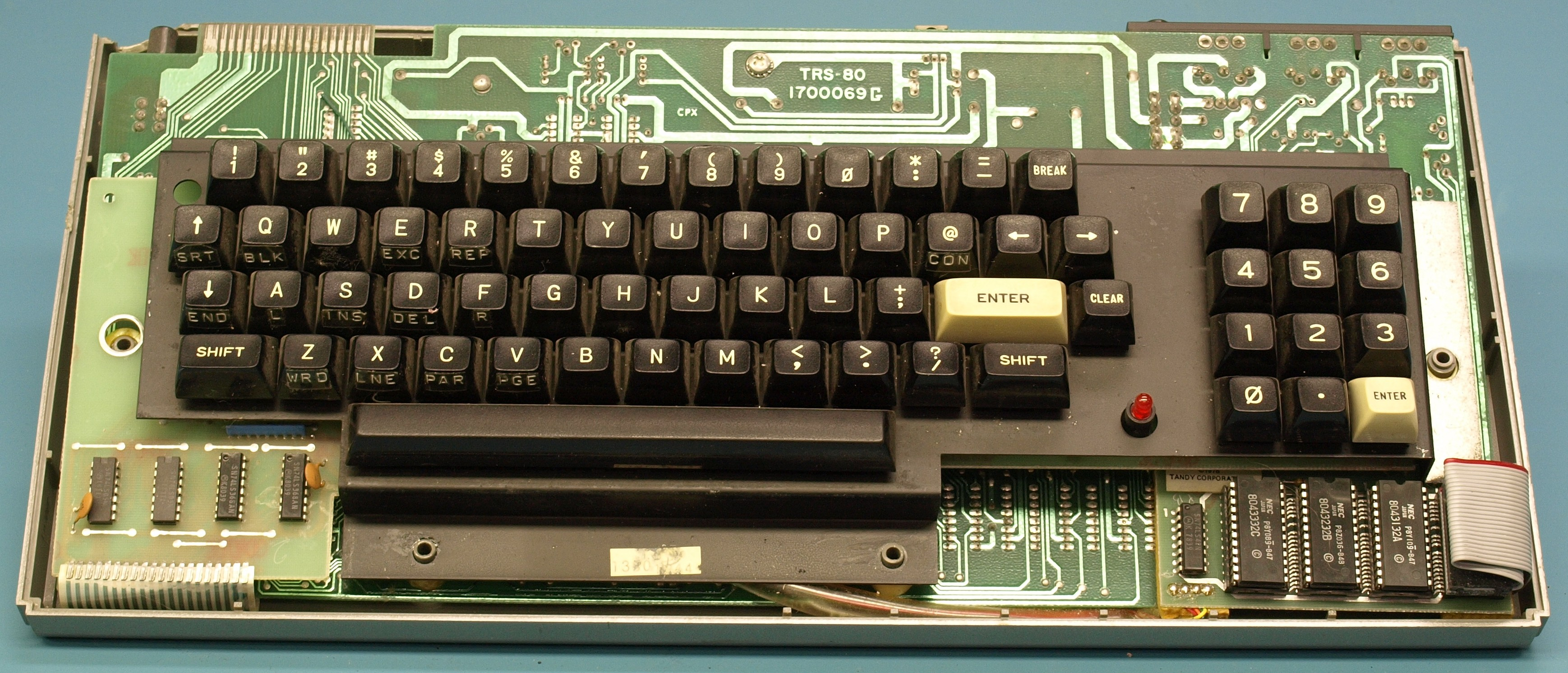
Tandy/Radio Shack TRS‑80 Model I Alps keyboard PCB

The TRS-80 Model I keyboard uses mechanical switches that suffer from "keyboard bounce", resulting in multiple letters being typed per keystroke. The problem was described in Wayne Green's editorial in the first issue of 80 Micro. Dirt, cigarette smoke, or other contamination enters the unsealed key switches, causing electrical noise that the computer detects as multiple presses. The key switches can be cleaned, but the bounce recurs when the keyboard is reexposed to the contaminating environment.

Keyboard bounce only occurs in Model I computers with Level II BASIC firmware; Level I BASIC has a "debounce" delay to the keyboard driver to avoid the noisy switch contacts. Tandy's KBFIX utility, the Model III, the last Model I firmware, and most third-party operating systems also implement the software fix, and Tandy changed the keyboard during the Model III's lifetime to an Alps Electric design with sealed switches. The Alps keyboard was available as an upgrade for the Model I for $79.

The keyboard is memory-mapped so that certain locations in the processor's memory space correspond to the status of a group of keys.

=== Video and audio ===
Layout of characters and pixels on the TRS-80 display

The color of the 12 in (300 mm) KCS 172 RCA monitor's text is faintly blue (the standard P4 phosphor used in black-and-white televisions). Green and amber filters, or replacement tubes to reduce eye fatigue were popular aftermarket items. Later models came with a green-on-black display.

Complaints about the video display quality were common. As Green wrote, "hells bells, [the monitor] is a cheap black and white television set with a bit of conversion for computer use". (The computer could be purchased without the Radio Shack monitor.) CPU access to the screen memory causes visible flicker. The bus arbitration logic blocks video display refresh (video-RAM reads) during CPU writes to the VRAM, causing a short black line. This has little effect on normal BASIC programs, but fast programs made with assembly language can be affected. Software authors worked to minimize the effect, and many arcade-style games are available for the Tandy TRS-80.

Because of bandwidth problems in the interface card that replaced the TV's tuner, the display loses horizontal sync if large areas of white are displayed. A simple half-hour hardware fix corrects the problem.

The graphics are displayed at a resolution of 64×16 character positions on a screen measuring 7.5 inches (19 cm) wide and 6.625 inches (16.83 cm) tall. Each character is composed of a 2×3 matrix of pixels, and corresponds to one byte of the 1 KB video memory used by the TRS-80. In each of those bytes, the first six bits control which pixel is displayed. The seventh bit is ignored, and the eighth toggles graphics mode. The reason that the seventh bit is ignored is due to the company's decision to have only seven 2102 static-RAM chips installed on the computer's motherboard instead of eight to keep the manufacturing cost low. Thus, there are no lowercase letters in the TRS-80 character set of an unmodified Model I, and the number of both graphics symbols and alphanumeric symbols is 64. This can be worked around by deleting the unused bit and piggybacking an eighth 2102 chip onto another. The alphanumeric symbols are displayed in 5×7 matrices of pixels. The 1978 manual for the popular word processor Electric Pencil came with instructions for modifying the computer. Although the modification needs to be disabled for Level II BASIC, its design became the industry standard and was widely sold in kit form, along with an eighth 2102 chip. Later models came with the hardware for the lowercase character set to be displayed with descenders.

With higher-density RAM chips and purpose-built monitors, higher-resolution crisp displays are obtainable; 80×24-character displays are available in the Model II, Model 4, and later systems.

The Model I has no built-in speaker. In addition to the AM-radio RF-interference method for audio, square-wave tones can be produced by outputting data to the cassette port and plugging an amplifier into the cassette "Mic" line. Most games use this ability for sound effects. An adapter was available to use Atari joysticks.

== Peripherals ==
=== Cassette tape drive ===
User data was originally stored on cassette tape. Radio Shack's model CTR-41 cassette recorder was included with the US$599 package. Leininger described the format as similar to one published by Hal Chamberlin; Tandy did not use the Tarbell Cassette Interface because of its much greater hardware cost, Leninger said.

The software-based cassette tape interface is slow and erratic; Green described it as "crummy ... drives users up the wall", and the first issue of 80 Micro has three articles on how to improve cassette performance. It is sensitive to audio volume, and the computer gives only a crude indication as to whether the correct volume was set, via a blinking character on screen while data is loaded. To find the correct volume at first use, the load is started and the volume is adjusted until the TRS-80 picked up the data. Then it is halted to rewind the tape and restart the load. Users were instructed to save multiple copies of a software program file, especially if audio tape cassettes instead of certified data tape was used. Automatic gain control or indicator circuits can be constructed to improve the loading process (the owner's manual provides complete circuit diagrams for the whole machine, including the peripheral interfaces, with notes on operation).

An alternative to using tape was data transmissions from the BBC's Chip Shop programme in the UK, which broadcast software for several different microcomputers over the radio. A special program was loaded using the conventional tape interface. Then the radio broadcast was connected to the cassette tape interface. Tandy eventually replaced the CTR-41 unit with the CTR-80 which had built-in AGC circuitry (and no volume control). This helped the situation, but tape operation is still unreliable.

TRS-80 Model I computers with Level I BASIC read and write tapes at 250 baud (about 30 bytes per second); Level II BASIC doubles this to 500 baud (about 60 bytes per second). Some programmers wrote machine-language programs that increase the speed to up to 2,000 bits per second without a loss of reliability on their tape recorders. With the Model III and improved electronics in the cassette interface, the standard speed increased to 1,500 baud which works reliably on most tape recorders.

For loading and storing data from tape, the CPU creates the sound by switching the output voltage between three states, creating crude sine wave audio.

The first version of the Model I also has a hardware problem that complicated loading programs from cassette recorders. Tandy offered a small board which was installed at a service center to correct the issue. The ROMs in later models were modified to correct this.

=== Model I Expansion Interface ===
Only the Model I uses an Expansion Interface; all later models have everything integrated in the same housing.

The TRS-80 does not use the S-100 bus like other early 8080 and Z80-based computers, but according to Leininger, its I/O can easily adapt to S-100 or other buses. A Tandy-proprietary Expansion Interface (E/I) box, which fits under the video monitor and serves as its base, was offered instead. Standard features of the E/I are a floppy disk controller, Centronics parallel port for a printer, and an added cassette connector. Optionally, an extra 16 or 32 KB of RAM can be installed and a daughterboard with an RS-232 port. The 40-conductor expansion connector passes through to a card edge connector, which permits the addition of external peripherals such as an outboard hard disk drive, a voice synthesizer, or a VOXBOX voice recognition unit. Leininger predicted in 1977 that Radio Shack or another company would release an expansion interface compatible with S-100.

Originally, printing with the Model I required the Expansion Interface, but later Tandy made an alternative parallel printer interface available.

The Model I Expansion Interface is the most troublesome part of the TRS-80 Model I system. It went through several revisions. The E/I connects to the CPU/keyboard with a 6-inch ribbon cable which is unshielded against RF interference and its card edge connector tends to oxidize due to its base metal contacts. This demands periodic cleaning with a pencil eraser in order to avoid spontaneous reboots, which contributes to its "Trash-80" sobriquet. Aftermarket connectors plated with gold solved this problem permanently. Software developers also responded by devising a recovery method which became a standard feature of many commercial programs. They accept an "asterisk parameter", an asterisk (star) character typed following the program name when the program is run from the TRSDOS Ready prompt. When used following a spontaneous reboot (or an accidental reset, program crash, or exit to TRSDOS without saving data to disk), the program loads without initializing its data area(s), preserving any program data still present from the pre-reboot session. Thus, for example, if a VisiCalc user suffers a spontaneous reboot, to recover data the user enters V+C+SPACE+✶ at TRSDOS Ready, and Visicalc restores the previous computing session intact. (Note: The user must take care not to do anything that could cause memory to be overwritten; they should recover immediately without running any other programs. Since programs may start automatically via the TRSDOS AUTO command, during a spontaneous reboot they take the precaution of holding down ↵ Enter to prevent this from happening. It takes TRSDOS some half a dozen seconds to load from a floppy disk; the user has this long to keep an AUTO'd program from loading. This star parameter became a standard for many software applications running on the Models III and 4; for instance LS-DOS's TED and Prosoft's Allwrite.)

The power button on the E/I is difficult to operate as it is recessed so as to guard against the user accidentally hitting it and turning it off while in use. A pencil eraser or similar object is used to depress the power button and the E/I has no power LED, making it difficult to determine if it is running or not.

The expansion unit requires a second power supply, identical to the base unit power supply. An interior recess holds both supplies.

The user is instructed to power on and power off all peripherals in proper order to avoid corrupting data or potentially damaging hardware components. The manuals for the TRS-80 advise turning on the monitor first, then any peripherals attached to the E/I (if multiple disk drives are attached, the last drive on the chain is to be powered on first and work down from there), the E/I, and the computer last. When powering down, the computer is to be turned off first, followed by the monitor, E/I, and peripherals. In addition, users are instructed to remove all disks from the drives during power up or down (or else leave the drive door open to disengage the read/write head from the disk). This is because a transient electrical surge from the drive's read/write head would create a magnetic pulse that could corrupt data. This was a common problem on many early floppy drives.

The E/I displays a screen full of garbage characters on power up and unless a bootable system disk is present in Drive 0, it hangs there until the user either presses RESET on the back of the computer, which causes it to attempt to boot the disk again, or Break+Reset was pressed, which drops the computer into BASIC. Due to the above-mentioned problems with potentially corrupting disks, it is recommended to power up to the garbage screen with the disk drives empty, insert a system disk, and then hit RESET.

InfoWorld compared the cable spaghetti connecting the TRS-80 Model I's various components to the snakes in Raiders of the Lost Ark. Radio Shack offered a "TRS-80 System Desk" that concealed nearly all the cabling. It can accommodate the complete computer system plus up to four floppy drives and the Quick Printer. Since the cable connecting the Expansion Interface carries the system bus, it is short (about 6 inches). The user has no choice but to place the E/I directly behind the computer with the monitor on top. This causes problems for a non-Tandy monitor whose case did not fit the mounting holes. Also, the friction fit of the edge connector on the already short interconnect cable makes it possible to disconnect the system bus from the CPU if either unit is bumped during operation.

=== Floppy disk drives ===
Radio Shack introduced floppy drives in July 1978, about six months after the Model I went on sale. The Model I disk operating system TRSDOS was written by Randy Cook under license from Radio Shack; Randy claimed to have been paid $3000 for it. The first version released to the public was a buggy v2.0. This was quickly replaced by v2.1. Floppy disk operation requires buying the Expansion Interface, which included a single-density floppy disk interface (with a formatted capacity of 85K) based on the Western Digital 1771 single-density floppy disk controller chip. The industry standard Shugart Associates SA-400 minifloppy disk drive was used. Four floppy drives can be daisy-chained to the Model I. The last drive in the chain is supposed to have a termination resistor installed but often it is not needed as it is integrated into later cables.

Demand for Model I drives greatly exceeded supply at first. The drive is unreliable, partly because the interface lacked an external data separator (buffer). The early versions of TRSDOS were also buggy, and not helped by the Western Digital FD1771 chip which cannot reliably report its status for several instruction cycles after it receives a command. A common method of handling the delay was to issue a command to the 1771, perform several "NOP" instructions, then query the 1771 for the result. Early TRSDOS neglects the required yet undocumented wait period, and thus false status often returns to the OS, generating random errors and crashes. Once the 1771 delay was implemented, it was fairly reliable.

In 1981, Steve Ciarcia published in Byte the design for a homemade, improved expansion interface with more RAM and a disk controller for the TRS-80.

A data separator and a double-density disk controller (based on the WD 1791 chip) were made by Percom (a Texas peripheral vendor), LNW, Tandy, and others. The Percom Doubler adds the ability to boot and use double density floppies using a Percom-modified TRSDOS called DoubleDOS. The LNDoubler adds the ability to read and write 5 1/4-inch (130 mm) diskette drives with up to 720 KB of storage, and also the older 8-inch (200 mm) diskettes with up to 1,155 KB. Near the end of the Model I's lifespan in 1982, upgrades were offered to replace its original controller with a double-density one.

The first disk drives offered on the Model I were Shugart SA-400s which supported 35 tracks and was the sole 5 1/4-inch drive on the market in 1977–78. By 1979, other manufacturers began offering drives. Models 3/4/4P uses Tandon TM-100 40-track drives. The combination of 40 tracks and double density gives a capacity of 180 kilobytes per single-sided floppy disk. The use of index-sync means that a "flippy disk" requires a second index hole and write-enable notch. One could purchase factory-made "flippies". Some software publishers formatted one side for Apple systems and the other for the TRS-80.

The usual method of connecting floppy drives involves setting the drive number via jumper blocks on the drive controller board, but Tandy opted for a slightly more user-friendly technique where all four select pins on the drives are jumpered and the ribbon cable is missing the Drive Select line. Thus, the user does not need to worry about moving jumpers around depending on which position on the chain a drive was in.

A standard flat floppy ribbon cable is usable on the Model I, in which case the drives is jumpered to their number on the chain, or even an IBM PC "twist" cable, which requires setting each drive number to 1, but only permits two drives on the chain.

Although third-party DOSes allow the user to define virtually any floppy format wanted, the "lowest common denominator" format for TRS-80s is the baseline single-density, single-sided, 35–40 track format of the Model I.

Third-party vendors like Aerocomp made available double-sided and 80 track 5 1/4-inch and later 3 1/2-inch floppy drives with up to 720 KB of storage each. These new drives are half-height and therefore require different or modified drive housings.

=== Exatron Stringy Floppy ===
An alternative to cassette tape and floppy disk storage from Exatron sold over 4,000 units by 1981. The device is a continuous loop tape drive, dubbed the stringy floppy or ESF. It requires no Expansion Interface, plugging directly into the TRS-80's 40-pin expansion bus, is much less expensive than a floppy drive, can read and write random-access data like a floppy drive unlike a cassette tape, and it transfers data at up to 14,400 baud. Exatron tape cartridges store over 64 KB of data. The ESF can coexist with the TRS-80 data cassette drive. Exatron also made a complementary RAM expansion board that installed in the TRS-80 keyboard to increase memory to 48 KB without the EI.

=== Hard drive ===
Radio Shack introduced a 5 MB external hard disk for the TRS-80 Model III/4 in 1983. It is the same hard disk unit offered for the Model II line, but came with OS software for Model III/4. An adapter is required to connect it to the Model I's E/I. The unit is about the same size as a modern desktop computer enclosure. Up to four hard disks can be daisy-chained for 20 MB of storage. The LDOS operating system by Logical Systems was bundled, which provides utilities for managing the storage space and flexible backup. The initial retail price for the first (primary) unit (US$2,495 (equivalent to $8,100 in 2025)). Later, a 15 MB hard disk was offered in a white case, which can be daisy-chained for up to 60 MB. Like most hard disks used on 8-bit machines, there is no provision for subdirectories, but the DiskDISK utility is a useful alternative that creates virtual hard disk ".DSK" files that can be mounted as another disk drive and used like a subdirectory would. To display the directory/contents of an unmounted DiskDISK virtual disk file, a shareware DDIR "Virtual Disk Directory Utility" program was commonly used.

=== Printers ===
The "Quick Printer" is an electrostatic rotary printer that scans the video memory through the bus connector, and prints an image of the screen onto aluminum-coated paper in about one second. However, it is incompatible with both the final, buffered version of the Expansion Interface, and with the "heartbeat" interrupt used for the real-time clock under Disk BASIC. This can be overcome by using special cabling, and by doing a "dummy" write to the cassette port while triggering the printer.

Two third-party printers were for 57 mm (2.2 in) metal-coated paper, selling for approximately DM 600 in Germany, and a dot-matrix printer built by Centronics for normal paper, costing at first DM 3000, later sold at approximately DM 1500 in some stores. It has only 7 pins, so letters with descenders such as lowercase "g" do not reach under the baseline, but are elevated within the normal line.

Radio Shack offered an extensive line of printers for the TRS-80 family, ranging from basic 9-pin dot matrix units to large wide-carriage line printers for professional use, daisy-wheel printers, inkjet, laser, and color plotters. All have a Centronics-standard interface and after the introduction of the Color Computer in 1980, many also had a connector for the CoCo's serial interface.

FP-215 is a flatbed plotter.

== Software ==
=== BASIC ===
Three versions of the BASIC programming language were produced for the Model I. Level I BASIC fits in 4 KB of ROM, and Level II BASIC fits into 12 KB of ROM. Level I is single precision only and had a smaller set of commands. Level II introduced double precision floating point support and has a much wider set of commands. Level II was further enhanced when a disk system was added, allowing for the loading of Disk BASIC.

Level I BASIC is based on Li-Chen Wang's free Tiny BASIC with more functions added by Radio Shack. David A. Lien helped French and Leininger decide what commands to add or remove from the language, and wrote the accompanying User's Manual for Level 1, teaching programming with text and cartoons. Lien wrote that it was "written specifically for people who don't know anything about computers ... I want you to have fun with your computer! I don't want you to be afraid of it, because there is nothing to fear". Reviewers praised the manual's quality; Lien later said that only Tandy and Epson understood the importance of writing good documentation before designing a technical product. Level I BASIC has only two string variables (A$ and B$), 26 numeric variables (A – Z), and one array, A(). Code for functions like SIN(), COS() and TAN() is not included in ROM but printed at the end of the book. The only error messages are "WHAT?" for syntax errors, "HOW?" for arithmetic errors such as division by zero, and "SORRY" for out of memory errors.

Level I BASIC is not tokenized; reserved words are stored literally. In order to maximize the code that fits into 4 KB of memory, users can enter abbreviations for reserved words. For example, writing "P." instead of "PRINT" saves 3 bytes.

Level II BASIC, introduced in mid-1978, was licensed from Microsoft and is required to use the expansion bus and disk drives. Radio Shack always intended for Level I BASIC to be a stopgap until Level II was ready, and the first brochure for the Model I in January 1978 mentioned that Level II BASIC was "coming soon". It is an abridged version of the 16K Extended BASIC, since the Model I has 12 KB of ROM space. According to Bill Gates, "It was a sort of intermediate between 8K BASIC and Extended BASIC. Some features from Extended BASIC such as descriptive errors and user-defined functions were not included, but there were double precision variables and the PRINT USING statement that we wanted to get in. The entire development of Level II BASIC took about four weeks from start to finish." The accompanying manual is more terse and technical than the Level I manual. Original Level I BASIC-equipped machines could be retrofitted to Level II through a ROM replacement performed by Radio Shack for a fee (originally $199). Users with Level I BASIC programs stored on cassette have to convert these to the tokenized Level II BASIC before use. A utility for this was provided with the Level II ROMS.

Disk BASIC allows disk I/O, and in some cases (NewDos/80, MultiDOS, DosPlus, LDOS) adds powerful sorting, searching, full-screen editing, and other features. Level II BASIC reserves some of these keywords and issues a "?L3 ERROR", suggesting a behind-the-scenes change of direction intervened between the creation of the Level II ROMs and the introduction of Disk BASIC.

Microsoft also marketed an enhanced BASIC called Level III BASIC written by Bill Gates, on cassette tape. The cassette contains a "Cassette File" version on one side and a "disk file" version on the second side for disk system users (which was to be saved to disk). Level III BASIC adds most of the functions in the full 16 KB version of BASIC plus many other TRS-80 specific enhancements. Many of Level III BASIC's features are included in the TRS-80 Model III's Level II BASIC and disk BASIC.

Level I BASIC was still offered on the Model I in either 4K or 16K configurations after the introduction of Level II BASIC.

=== Other programming languages ===
Radio Shack published a combined assembler and program editing package called the Series I Assembler Editor. 80 Micro magazine printed a modification enabling it to run under the Model 4's TRSDOS Version 6. Also from Radio Shack was Tiny Pascal.

Microsoft made its Fortran, COBOL and BASCOM BASIC compiler available through Radio Shack.

In 1982, Scientific Time Sharing Corporation published a version of its APL for the TRS-80 Model III as APL*PLUS/80.

=== Other applications ===
Blackjack and backgammon came with the TRS-80, and at its debut, Radio Shack offered four payroll, personal finance, and educational programs on cassette. Its own products' quality was often poor. A critical 1980 80 Micro review of a text adventure described it as "yet another example of Radio Shack's inability to deal with the consumer in a consumer's market". The magazine added, "Sadly, too, as with some other Radio Shack programs, the instructions seem to assume that the reader is either a child or an adult with the mentality of a slightly premature corned beef".

The more than 2,000 Radio Shack franchise stores as of September 1982 sold third-party hardware and software, but the more than 4,300 company-owned stores were at first prohibited from reselling or even mentioning products not sold by Radio Shack itself. Green stated in 1980 that although "there are more programs for the 80 than for all other systems combined" because of the computer's large market share, "Radio Shack can't advertise this because they are trying as hard as they can to keep this fact a secret from their customers. They don't want the TRS-80 buyers to know that there is anything more than their handful of mediocre programs available", many of which "are disastrous and, I'm sure, doing tremendous damage to the industry". Broderbund, founded that year, began by publishing TRS-80 software, but by 1983 cofounder Doug Carlston said that the computer "turned out to be a terrible market because most of the distribution networks were closed, even though there were plenty of machines out there". Green wrote in 1982 that Apple had surpassed Tandy in sales and sales outlets despite the thousands of Radio Shack dealers because it supported third-party development, while "we find the Shack seeming to begrudge any sale not made by them and them alone". Dealers not affiliated with Radio Shack preferred to sell software for other computers and not compete with the company; mail-order sales were also difficult, because company-owned stores did not sell third-party publications like 80 Micro.

Charles Tandy reportedly wanted to encourage outside developers but after his death a committee ran the company, which refused to help outside developers, hoping to monopolize the sale of software and peripherals. Leininger reportedly resigned because he disliked the company's bureaucracy after Tandy's death. An author wrote in a 1979 article on the computer's "mystery of machine language graphics control" that "Radio Shack seems to hide the neat little jewels of information a hobbyist needs to make a treasure of the TRS-80". He stated that other than the "excellent" Level I BASIC manual "there has been little information until recently ... TRS-80 owners must be resourceful", reporting that the computer's "keyboard, video, and cassette" functionality were also undocumented. The first book authorized by Tandy with technical information on TRSDOS for the Model I did not appear until after the computer's discontinuation.

By 1982, the company admitted—after no software appeared for the Model 16 after five months—that it should have, like Apple, encouraged third-party developers of products like the killer app VisiCalc. (A lengthy 1980 article in a Tandy publication introducing the TRS-80 version of VisiCalc did not mention that the spreadsheet had been available for the Apple II for a year.) However, in the early 1980s, it was not uncommon for small companies and municipalities to write custom programs for computers such as the TRS-80 to process a variety of data. In one case a small town's vehicle fleet was managed from a single TRS-80.

By 1985, the company's Ed Juge stated that other than Scripsit and DeskMate, "we intend to rely mostly on 'big-name', market-proven software from leading software firms". A full suite of office applications became available from the company and others, including the VisiCalc and Multiplan spreadsheets and the Lazy Writer, Electric Pencil, and from Radio Shack itself the Scripsit and SuperScripsit word processors.

Compared to the contemporary Commodore and Apple micros, the TRS-80's block graphics and crude sound were widely considered limited. The faster speed available to the game programmer, not having to processor color data in high resolution, went a long way to compensating for this. TRS-80 arcade games tended to be faster with effects that emphasized motion. This perceived disadvantage did not deter independent software companies such as Big Five Software from producing unlicensed versions of arcade games like Namco's Galaxian, Atari's Asteroids, Taito's Lunar Rescue, Williams's Make Trax, and Exidy's Targ and Venture. Sega's Frogger and Zaxxon were ported to the computer and marketed by Radio Shack. Namco/Midway's Pac-Man was cloned by Philip Oliver and distributed by Cornsoft Group as Scarfman. Atari's Battlezone was cloned for the Models I/III by Wayne Westmoreland and Terry Gilman and published by Adventure International as Armored Patrol. They also cloned Eliminator (based on Defender) and Donkey Kong; the latter was not published until after the TRS-80 was discontinued, because Nintendo refused to license the game.

Some games originally written for other computers were ported to the TRS-80. Microchess has three levels of play and can run in the 4 KB of memory that is standard with the Model I; the classic ELIZA is another TRS-80 port. Both were offered by Radio Shack. Apple Panic, itself a clone of Universal's Space Panic, was written for the TRS-80 by Yves Lempereur and published by Funsoft. Epyx's Temple of Apshai runs slowly on the TRS-80. Infocom ported its series of interactive text-based adventure games to the Models I/III; the first, Zork I, was marketed by Radio Shack.

Adventure International's text adventures began on the TRS-80, as did Sea Dragon by Westmoreland and Gilman, later ported to the other home micros. Android Nim by Leo Christopherson was rewritten for the Commodore PET and Apple. Many games are unique to the TRS-80, including Duel-N-Droids, also by Christopherson, an early first-person shooter 13 Ghosts by Software Affair (the Orchestra-80, -85 and -90 people) and shooters like Cosmic Fighter and Defence Command, and strange experimental programs such as Christopherson's Dancing Demon, in which the player composes a song for a devil and choreographs his dance steps to the music. Radio Shack offered simple graphics animation programs Micro Movie and Micro Marquee, and Micro Music.

Radio Shack offered a number of programming utilities, including an advanced debugger, a subroutine package, and a cross-reference builder. One of the most popular utility package was Super Utility written by Kim Watt of Breeze Computing. Other utility software such as Stewart Software's Toolkit offered the first sorted directory, decoding or reset of passwords, and the ability to eliminate parts of TRSDOS that were not needed in order to free up floppy disk space. They also produced the On-Line 80 BBS, a TRSDOS-based Bulletin Board System. Misosys Inc. was a producer of TRS-80 utility and language software for all models of TRS-80 beginning in 1978.

Perhaps because of the lack of information on TRSDOS and its bugs, by 1982 perhaps more operating systems existed for the TRS-80 than for any other computer. TRSDOS is limited in its capabilities, since like Apple DOS 3.3 on the Apple II, it is mainly conceived of as a way of extending BASIC to support disk drives. Numerous alternative DOSes appeared, the most prominent being LDOS because Radio Shack licensed it from Logical Systems and adopted it as its official DOS for its Models I and III hard disk drive products. Other alternative TRS-80 DOSes included NewDOS from Apparat, Inc., and DoubleDOS, DOSPlus, MicroDOS, UltraDOS (later called Multidos). The DOS for the Model 4 line, TRSDOS Version 6, was produced by and licensed from Logical Systems. It is a derivative of LDOS, enhanced to allow for the new Model 4 hardware such as its all-RAM architecture (no ROM), external 32 KB memory banks, bigger screen and keyboard, and featured new utilities such as a ram disk and a printer spooler.

The memory map of the Model I and III render them incompatible with the standard CP/M OS for Z80 business computers, which loads at hexadecimal address $0000 with TPA (Transient Program Area) starting at $0100; the TRS-80 ROM resides in this address space. Omikron Systems' Mappers board remaps the ROM to run unmodified CP/M programs on the Model I. A customized version of CP/M is available but loses its portability advantage. 80 Micro magazine published a do-it-yourself CP/M modification for the Model III.

== Reception ==
Dan Fylstra, among the first owners, wrote in Byte in April 1978 that as an "'appliance' computer ... the TRS-80 brings the personal computer a good deal closer to the average customer", suitable for home and light business use. He concluded that it "is not the only alternative for the aspiring personal computer user, but it is a strong contender." Jerry Pournelle wrote in 1980 that "the basic TRS-80 is a lot of computer for the money". He criticized the quality of Tandy's application and system software and the high cost of peripherals, but reported that with the Omikron board a customer paid less than $5000 for a computer compatible with TRS-80 and CP/M software "all without building a single kit".

Three years later Pournelle was less positive about the computer. He wrote in May 1983, "As to our TRS-80 Model I, we trashed that sucker long ago. It was always unreliable, and repeated trips to the local Radio Shack outlet didn't help. The problem was that Tandy cut corners". Pournelle wrote in July 1983:

I'm a little bitter about my experiences with Tandy. I had genuinely thought that the Model I was the machine of the future: an inexpensive home computer that could be expanded by stages until it would do professional work. Of course it was never that. First, Tandy tried to fence in Model I users through that goofy operating system, and then it wouldn't let Radio Shack stores sell non-Tandy software. ... It had never been all that well designed, and when sales took off much faster than anticipated, the quality control system couldn't cope.

== Compatible successors ==
Tandy replaced the Model I with the broadly compatible Model III in 1980. (The TRS-80 Model II is an entirely different and incompatible design).

=== Model III ===
TRS-80 Model III
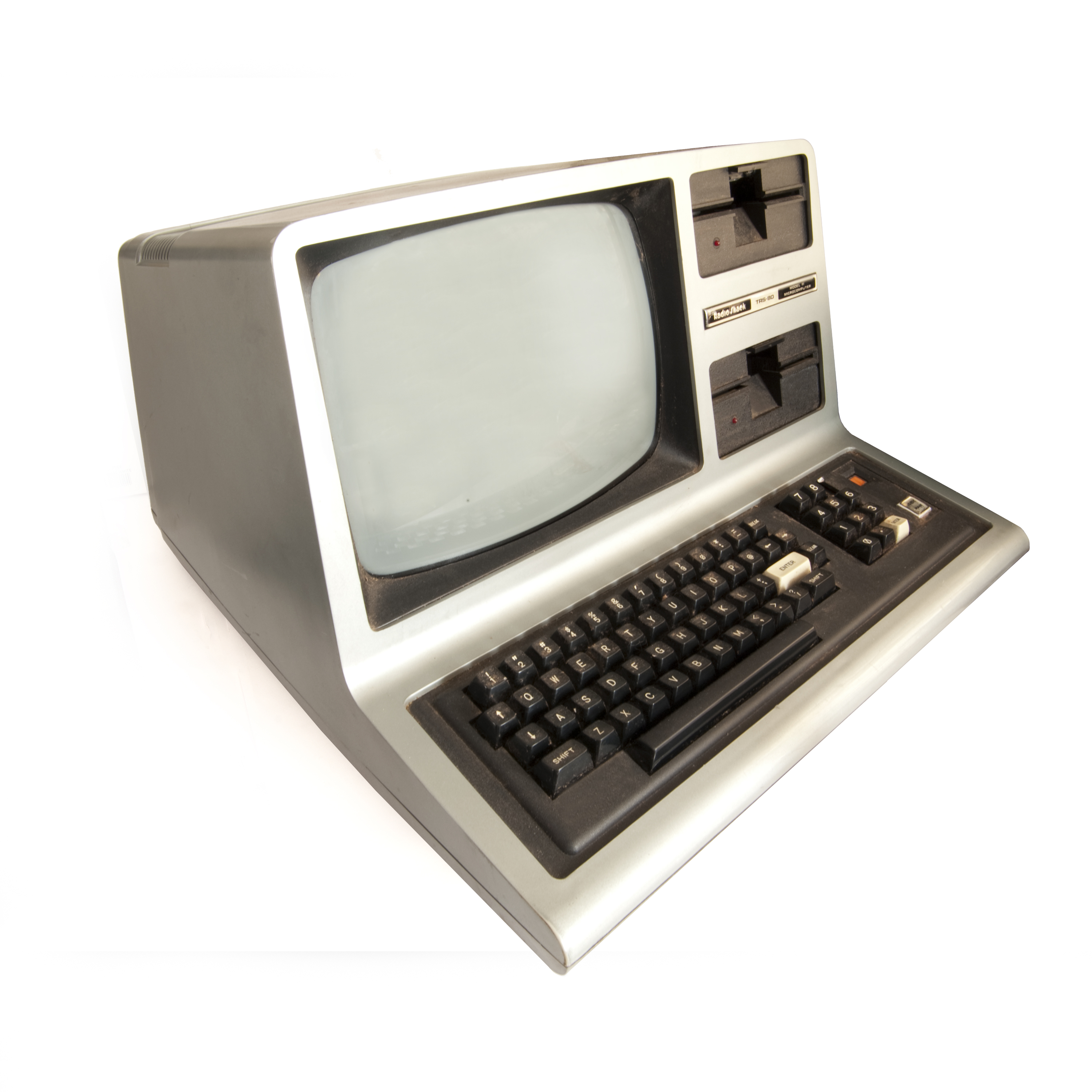
- Manufacturer: Tandy Corporation
- Type: Home and small business computer
- Released: July 1980; 46 years ago
- Introductory price: $699 (4KB RAM, Level I); $999 (16K, Level II); $2495 (48K, two 180 KB floppy drives, RS-232C)
- Discontinued: September 1983; 43 years ago
- Operating system: TRSDOS 1.3, LDOS 5
- CPU: Zilog Z80A @ 2 MHz
- Memory: 4 KB or 16, 32 or 48 KB
- Display: 16 rows by 64 or 32 columns, block graphics
- Graphics: optional 640 by 240 pixels, $369 extra
- Sound: output through cassette port
- Backward compatibility: Model I Z80 code ~ 80% (higher with patches), BASIC 100%
- Predecessor: Model I
- Successor: Model 4

Tandy released the TRS-80 Model III on July 26, 1980. The improvements of the Model III over the Model I include: built-in lowercase, a better keyboard with repeating keys, an enhanced character set, a real-time clock, 1500-baud cassette interface, a faster (2.03 MHz) Z80 processor, and an all-in-one enclosure requiring fewer cables. A Model III with two floppy drives requires the use of only one electrical outlet; a two-drive Model I requires five outlets. (Note: One outlet each for the CPU/keyboard, Expansion Interface, Video Monitor, and the drives.) The Model III avoids the complicated power on/off sequence of the Model I. Shortly after the Model III's introduction, Model I production was discontinued as it did not comply with new FCC regulations as of January 1, 1981, regarding electromagnetic interference.

Tandy distinguished between the high-end Model II and Model III, describing the former as "an administrative system, good for things like word processing, data management and VisiCalc operations" and suitable for small businesses. The lowest-priced version of the Model III was sold with 4 KB of RAM and cassette storage. The computer's CPU board has three banks of sockets (8 sockets to a bank) which take type 4116 DRAMs, so memory configurations come in 16 KB, 32 KB, or 48 KB RAM memory sizes. Computers with 32 KB or 48 KB RAM can be upgraded with floppy disk drive storage. There is space inside the computer cabinet for two full-height drives. Those offered by Tandy/Radio Shack are single-sided, 40-track, double-density (MFM encoding) for 180K of storage. Third-party suppliers offered double-sided and 80-track drives, though to control them they had to modify the TRSDOS driver code or else furnish an alternative third-party DOS which could (see below). The installation of floppy disk drives also requires the computer's power supply to be upgraded. There is no internal cooling fan in the Model III; it uses passive convection cooling (unless an unusual number of power-hungry expansions were installed internally, such as a hard disk drive, graphics board, speedup kit, RS-232 board, etc.).

Tandy claimed that the Model III was compatible with 80% of Model I software. Many software publishers issued patches to permit their Model I programs to run on the Model III. Marketing director Ed Juge explained that their designers considered changing from the Model I's 64-column by 16-row video screen layout, but that they ultimately decided that maintaining compatibility was most important.

The Model III's memory map and system architecture are mostly the same as the Model I's, but the disk drives and printer port were moved from memory mapped to port I/O, thus Model I software that attempts to manipulate the disk controller directly or output to the printer (in particular Model I DOSes and application packages such as Visicalc and Scripsit) will not work. Under the supplied TRSDOS 1.3 operating system Model I disks can be read in the Model III, but not vice versa. The optional LDOS OS (by Logical Systems Inc.) uses a common disk format for both Model I and Model III versions.

Customers and developers complained of bugs in the Model III's Microsoft BASIC interpreter and TRSDOS. Tandy/Radio Shack (and TRS-80 magazines like 80 Micro) periodically published many software patches to correct these deficiencies and to permit users to customize the software to their preferences.

Differences in the WD1771 and WD1791 floppy controllers created problems reading Model I disks on a Model III (the double-density upgrade in the Model I included both chips while a Model III had only the WD1791). The WD1771 supports four data markers while the WD1791 only supports two, and some versions of TRSDOS for the Model I also use them. In addition, they are used by copy protection schemes. Software was available to allow Model I disks to be read on a Model III. The WD1791 supports the 500-bit/s bitrate needed for high-density floppy drives, but the controller is not capable of using them without extensive modifications.

TRSDOS for the Model III was developed in-house by Radio Shack rather than being contracted out like the Model I's DOS. None of the code base from Model I DOS was reused and the Model III DOS was rewritten from scratch; this also created some compatibility issues since the Model III DOS's API was not entirely identical to the Model I DOS. This was primarily to avoid legal disputes with Randy Cook over ownership of the code as had occurred with Model I DOS and also because Radio Shack originally planned several features for the Model III such as 80-column text support that were not included. Two early versions, 1.1 and 1.2, were replaced by version 1.3 in 1981 which became the standard Model III OS. TRSDOS 1.3 is not format compatible with 1.1 and 1.2; a utility called XFERSYS is provided which converts older format disks to TRSDOS 1.3 format (this change is permanent and the resultant disks cannot be read with the older DOS versions).

The Model III's boot screen was cleaned up from the Model I. Instead of displaying garbage on the screen at power up, it displays a "Diskette?" prompt if a bootable floppy is not detected. The user can insert a disk and press any key to boot. On powerup or reset holding down the Break key will boot the computer into ROM-based Level II BASIC. This ability is useful if the disk drive is not functioning and cannot boot a TRSDOS disk (or if a boot disk is not available); it permits an operator familiar with the machine hardware to perform diagnostics using BASIC's PEEK and POKE commands. This works for the Model 4 as well, but not for the 4P.

While Model I DOS is fairly flexible in its capabilities, Model III DOS is hard-coded to only support 180K single-sided floppies, a problem fixed by the many third-party DOSes. To that end, when Radio Shack introduced hard disks for the TRS-80 line in 1982, the company licensed LDOS rather than attempting to modify Model III DOS for hard disk support.

Level II BASIC on the Model III is 16 KB in size and incorporates a few features from Level I Disk BASIC.

TRSDOS 1.3 was given a few more minor updates, the last being in 1984, although the version number was unchanged. This includes at least one update that writes an Easter Egg message "Joe, you rummy buzzard" on an unused disk sector, which is reputedly a joke message left by a programmer in a beta version, but accidentally included in the production master.

The Model III keyboard lacks CONTROL. Many application programs use @, while others use ⇧ Shift+↑. Often CLEAR is used in combination with number and alpha keys. The Model III keyboard also lacks ⇪ Caps Lock; to caps-lock the alpha keys the user presses ⇧ Shift+0. Under LDOS typeahead is supported.

Because TRSDOS 1.3 was found wanting by many users, Tandy offered (at added cost) Logical System's LDOS Version 5 as an alternative. As with the Model I, other third-party sources also offered TRSDOS alternatives for the Model III, including NewDOS, Alphabit's MultiDOS, and Micro Systems Software's DOSPlus. These are compatible with TRSDOS 1.3 and run the same application programs, but offer improved command structures, more and better system utilities, and enhancements to the Microsoft BASIC interpreter. After writing the original Model I TRSDOS, Randy Cook began work on his own DOS, titled VTOS, which was superseded by LDOS and also created some frustration for users as it is the only TRS-80 DOS to be copy-protected.

Although mostly intended as a disk-based computer, the Model III was available in a base cassette configuration with no disk hardware and only 16 KB of RAM with Level II BASIC. Radio Shack also offered a 4K version with Level I BASIC, identical to Model I Level I BASIC, but with the addition of LPRINT and LLIST commands for printer output. Upgrading to a disk machine necessitates installing at least 32 KB of RAM, the disk controller board, and another power supply for the disk drives. Disk upgrades purchased from Radio Shack included TRSDOS 1.3; users upgrading from third-party vendors had to purchase DOS separately (most opted for LDOS or DOSPlus), though a great many Model III applications programs included a licensed copy of TRSDOS 1.3.

As with the Model I's E/I, the RS-232C port on the Model III was an extra cost option and not included in the base price of the computer, though the dual disk Model III for $2495 included the serial port.

Like the Model I, the Model III sold well in the educational market. Many school administrators valued the Model III's all-in-one hardware design because it made it more difficult for students to steal components. InfoWorld approved of the Model III's single-unit design, simplified cable management, and improvements such as lack of keyboard bounce and improved disk reliability. The reviewer, a former Model I owner, stated "I'm impressed" and that "had the Model III been available, it's probable that I wouldn't have sold it". He concluded, "If you're looking for a computer that's not too expensive but that performs well, you would be wise to test the Model III—you might end up buying it."

Don French, who had left Radio Shack to found FMG Software after designing the Model I, expressed his disappointment in the new machine while trying to convert CP/M to run on it. "I've encountered numerous problems with the floppy drive and its interface. Radio Shack will sell a Model III to anyone. They're trying to market it as a business computer when the existing software is woefully inadequate. 48K just isn't enough. You run out of memory before you get going. They're selling a medical package that takes up nine disks. I think the Model III is a very poorly conceived machine".

==== Aftermarket products ====
Aftermarket hardware was offered by Tandy/Radio Shack and many third-party manufacturers. The usual selection of add-ons and peripherals available for the Model I were offered: outboard floppy drives (one or two could be plugged into a card-edge connector on the back panel), an outboard hard disk drive (LDOS was furnished as Tandy's hard drive OS vice TRSDOS), an RS-232C serial port on an internal circuit card, and a parallel printer (connected by a card-edge connector). Multiple high-resolution graphics solutions were available. The official Radio Shack Model III high-resolution graphics board had a screen resolution of 640 × 240 pixels. The third-party Micro-Labs "Grafyx Solution" board had a screen resolution of 512 × 192 pixels. A popular hardware/software add-on was the Orchestra-90 music synthesizer. It can be programmed to play up to five voices with a range of six octaves stereophonically. A great many Orch-90 (as it was often called) music files were available for download from CompuServe. The Orch-90 was licensed from a company called Software Affair, which also produced the Model I-compatible Orchestra-85 from 1981.

At least three vendors produced CP/M modifications for the Model III, Omikron (also a Model I mod), Holmes Engineering, and Memory Merchant. Options were available for upgrading the CRT to the CP/M professional standard of 80 columns and 24 rows, as well as eight-inch floppy drives.

A number of third-party manufacturers specialized in upgrading Model IIIs with high-performance hardware and software, and remarketing them under their own labels. (Note: It was necessary to rebrand these highly modified Model IIIs because Radio Shack enforced a strict policy that no repair service would be performed on nonstandard RS products.) The improvements typically included internal hard disk drives, greater capacity floppy drives, 4 MHz Z80 speedup kits, professional-grade green or amber CRT video displays, better DOS software (typically DOSPlus by Micro Systems Software or LDOS by Logical Systems) including the all-important hard drive backup utilities, and custom menu-driven shell interfaces which insulated non-expert users (business employees) from the DOS command line. These were touted as high productivity turnkey systems for small businesses at less cost than competing business systems from higher-end providers such as IBM and DEC, as well as Radio Shack's own TRS-80 Model II.

=== Model 4 ===
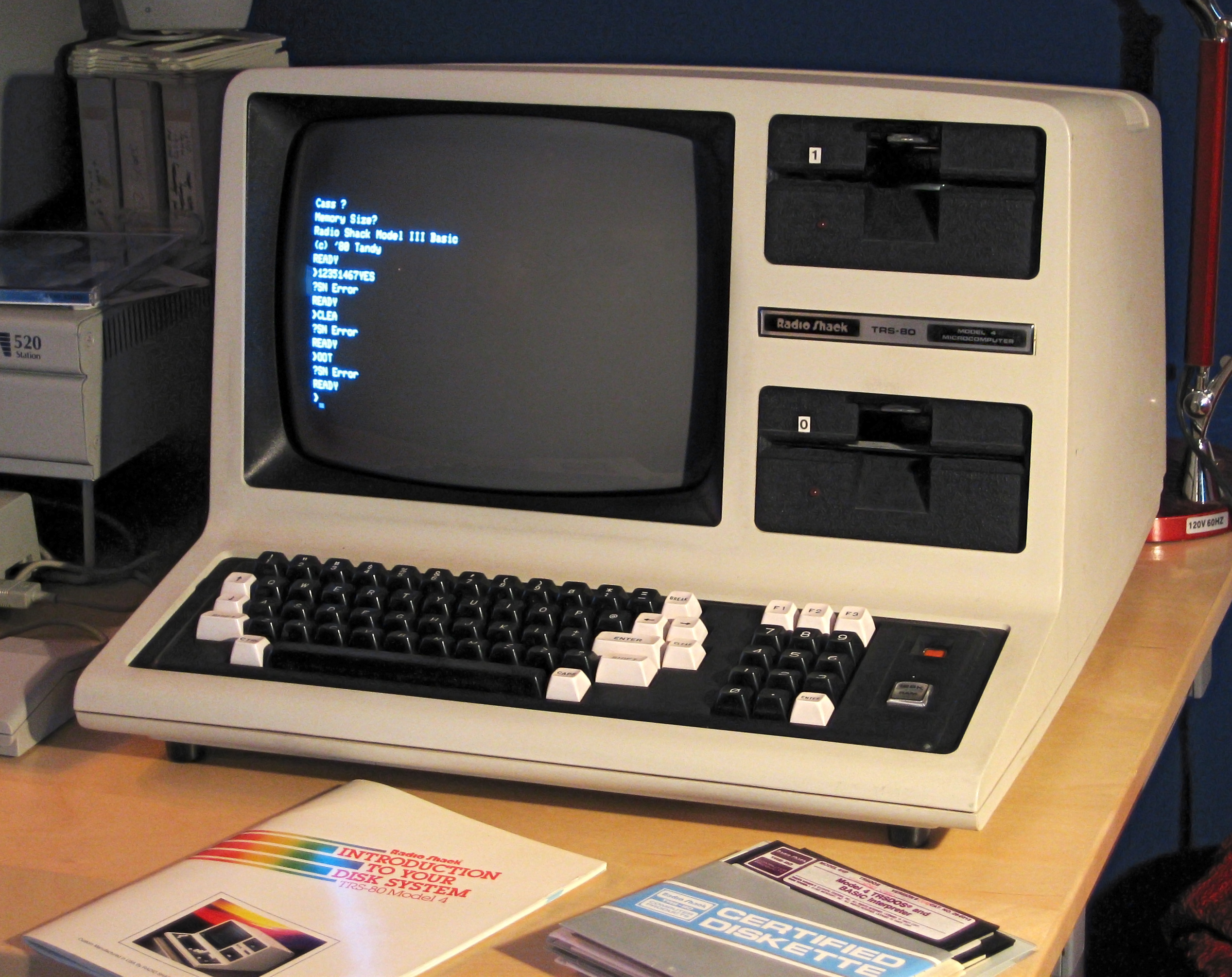
TRS-80 Model 4 (standard version)

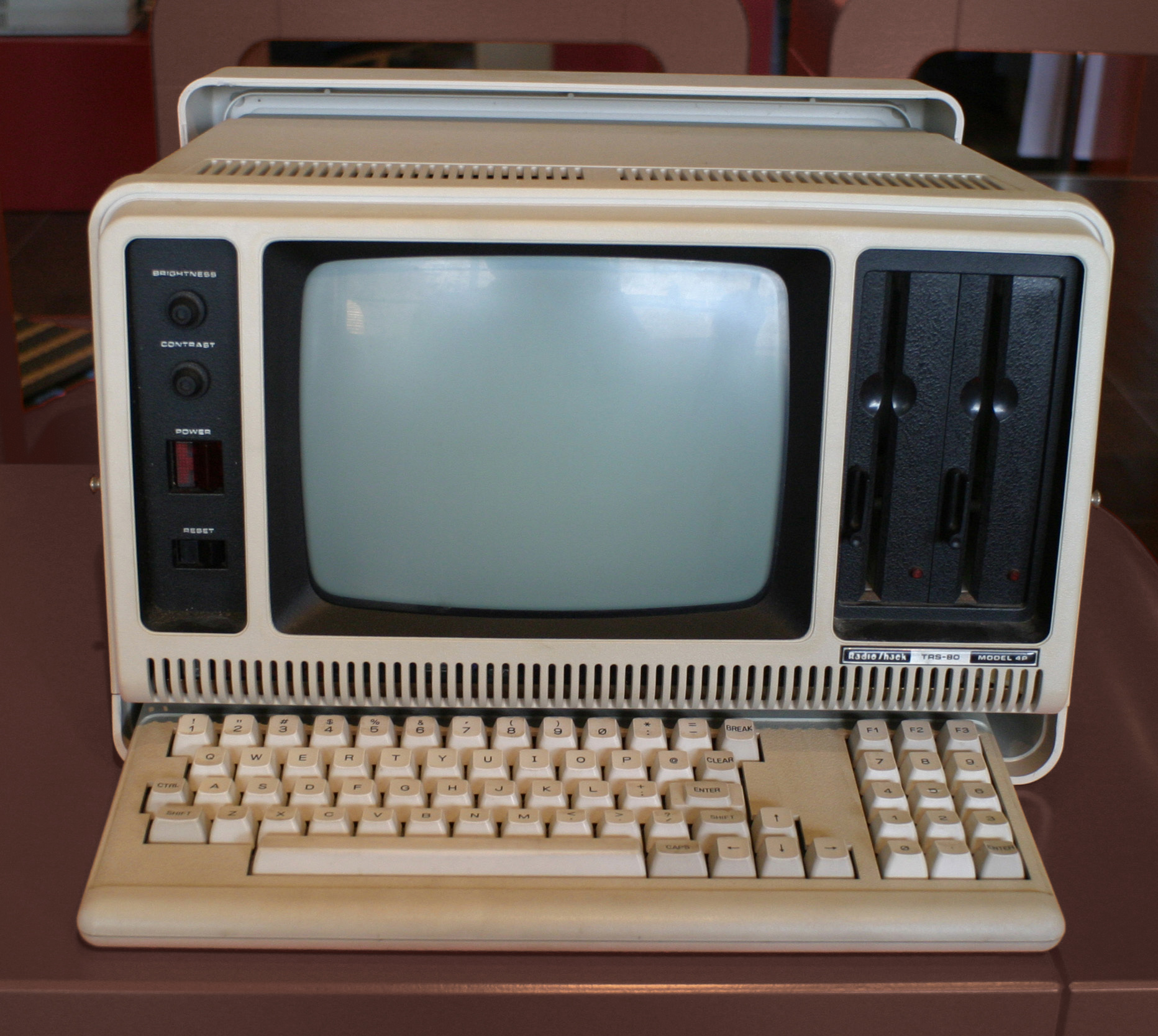
TRS-80 Model 4P

The successor to the Model III is the TRS-80 Model 4 released in April 1983. It has a faster Z80A 4 MHz CPU, a larger video display 80 columns × 24 rows with reverse video, bigger keyboard, internal speaker, and its 64 KB of RAM can be upgraded to 128 KB of bank-switched RAM. The display can be upgraded with a high-resolution graphics card yielding 640 × 240 pixels. The Model 4 is fully compatible with Model III and CP/M application software. A diskless Model 4 (with 16 KB RAM and Level II BASIC) cost $999, with 64 KB RAM and one single-sided 180K disk drive $1,699, and two drives with RS-232C $1,999; an upgrade for Model III owners cost $799 and provided a new motherboard and keyboard. Tandy sold 71,000 in 1984.

The Model 4 includes all of the Model III's hardware, port assignments, and operating modes, making it 100% compatible. Model III programs running on a Model 4 can access the Model 4's added hardware features (like 4 MHz clock rate, bigger video screen and keyboard, banked RAM above 64 KB). There were aftermarket software packages that made this ability available to non-programmer users.

The Model 4P is a transportable version introduced in September 1983 and discontinued in early 1985. It is functionally the same as the dual-drive desktop model but lacks the card edge connector for two outboard diskette drives and for a cassette tape interface. It has a slot for an internal modem card and could emulate a Model III.

The Model 4D with bundled Deskmate productivity suite was introduced in early 1985. It has a revised CPU board using faster gate array logic which includes the floppy controller and RS-232C circuitry, all on a single board. The computer has two internal double-sided diskette drives and is the last model descended from the 1977 Model I. It retailed for $1,199 at its introduction in 1985. During 1987–1988 the retail stores removed the Model 4Ds from display but they were available by special order through 1991.

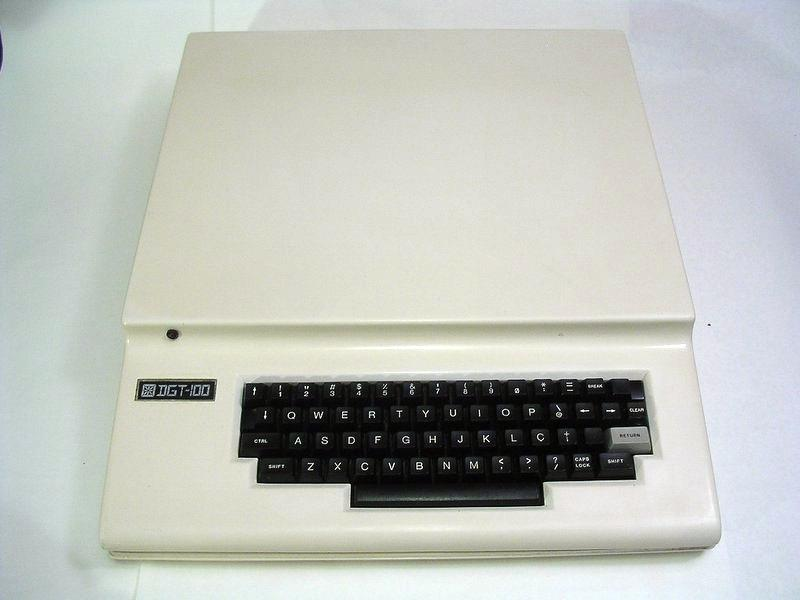
DGT-100 by DIGITUS Ind. Com. Serv. de Eletrônica Ltda., one of a dozen brands of TRS-80 clones made by other companies

=== Model 100 ===
Also in April 1983, Radio Shack released the TRS-80 Model 100, one of the first laptop-portable computers.

Manufactured by Kyocera, the Model 100 features an LCD with 8 lines of 40 characters each, 8 kilobytes of RAM (expandable to 32KB), and is powered by AA cell batteries (or a plug-in adapter). A built-in modem and 25-pin RS-232 serial port provided connectivity.

With the rudimentary operating system held in ROM, the Model 100 (and the improved model, named the Tandy 102) was ready to use immediately after sliding the power switch on, and work would be held ready when switched off, making it convenient to use for a few moments at a time. This speed made the Model 100/102 useful well after powerful—and slower-booting—laptop computers became common.

The Model 100-series computers also found popularity as a field-portable communications terminal due to its light weight and simplicity.

== See also ==
- TRS-80 character set
- List of TRS-80 games
- List of software for the TRS-80
- List of TRS-80 clones
- SoftSide, magazine with BASIC programs for the TRS-80 and other microcomputers
- The Alternate Source Programmer's Journal, TRS-80 magazine with technical programming articles
