= FilePro =

filePro is a proprietary DBMS and RAD system originally developed by Howard Wolowitz as The Electric File Clerk in 1978. He licensed it to Tandy Corporation in 1979 who first published it in 1980 as Profile II.

Although there was a Profile for the TRS-80 model I, model III and model IV, these were unrelated programs. Today's filePro started out on the Model II and was first released by Tandy as "Profile II". After passing through several owners, the code is currently the property of fPTechnologies, Inc.

== Current status ==
The product no longer ships with a printed user manual; however, there is a manual available online at fpTech's website as well as a single third-party full reference book available, written by the late Stuart Werner of STN along with a single third-party quick-reference guide written by Laura Brody (former programmer) and Ken Brody (senior programmer of filePro) "Laura's filePro Quick Reference Guide for v5.0, " . Laura and Ken Brody also published 5 issues of the "filePro Developer's Journal"

There are several filePro resources available online including a user maintained mailing list—for more information, visit http://lists.celestial.com/mailman/listinfo/filepro-list

== History ==
1978
Howard Wolowitz develops Electric File Clerk for the TRS-80 Model II.
1979
The small Computer Company is founded.
1980
Tandy Corporation publishes it as Profile II.
????
Profile II Plus is released.
1983
Profile 16 is released for the TRS-80 Model 16 running Xenix.
????
Profile 16 Plus is released.
????
filePro 16 and filePro 16 Plus are released by The small Computer Company for non-Tandy computers. (Profile was a trademark licensed by Tandy.)
1986
Version 3.0 released for both filePro 16 and filePro 16 Plus. This was the last version for the non-Plus filePro 16. Further versions also dropped the 16 part of the name.
????
filePro Plus Version 4.0 released.
????
The small Computer Company is bought by another company (Athena Investment Group), and becomes a subsidiary of that company. Over the next years, the parent company itself changes hands several times.
????
Version 4.5 released.
????
Version 4.8 released.
1998
fPTechnologies, Inc. is founded by the filePro employees, and buys the rights to filePro.
????
Version 5.0 released.
2006
Version 5.6 released.
2009
Reorganized and renamed fP Technologies of Ohio, Inc.

== Database Features ==
=== Strengths ===
- Fast data lookups
- Short learning curve (for programmers, user experience is software dependent).
- Data entry system allows for quick familiarity with keyboard shortcuts, and as such, typists do not have to rely on mouse acquisition
- Provides version updates and bug releases for operating systems for more than a decade
- Ability to create PDF outputs and reports automatically. (filePro version 5.8)
- Excellent for performing data imports and data manipulation.
- Able to connect to MySQL and utilize the power of filePro to read / write / report data from MySQL data. (Linux filePro 5.7 and higher)
- Dual write capabilities. (Redundant mirror backup) (filePro 5.8.01.03)
- Data Encryption at field and table level. (filePro 5.8.00.03)
- Multi Platform - applications created on one operating system can be converted to other platforms easily. (Support for: Windows (32 and 64 Bit), SCO Openserver Unix/Unixware, Linux (32 and 64 Bit), Sun, HP-UX, IBM AIX, IBM eServer iSeries Linux and FreeBSD (64 Bit))
- 26 Available Automatic Indexes with 10 Demand Index options
- Mathematical Precision - 16 Places to left. 8 places to right of decimal.

=== Weaknesses ===
- fP SQL support is read-only ( fP SQL Query and Report Generator )
- Only supports 24 lines of 80 characters
- Maximum print width of 255 characters per line

== Trivia ==
- The Big Bang Theory pays homage to one of the founding partners of the small Computer Company by naming one of the characters "Howard Wolowitz". (Showrunner Bill Prady was a business partner of Wolowitz's at one time; the actual Wolowitz has appeared in a cameo on the show.)
