= DeskMate =

Tandy operating environment

- DeskMate version 3.02
- Developer: Tandy
- Release: November 1984; 41 years ago
- Stable release: 3.05 / c.1992; 34 years ago
- Operating system: TRSDOS, MS-DOS
- Type: GUI
- License: Proprietary

DeskMate is a software application that provides a graphical operating environment. It originally was for Tandy Corporation's TRSDOS Operating System for their TRS-80 line of computers, but eventually shifted to MS-DOS. Like GEM from Digital Research, it is not a full operating system, but runs on top an existing system. Initial ports only ran on Tandy's PCs such as the Tandy 1000, but later became available for true IBM PC compatibles and competed with early versions of Microsoft Windows.

Some non-Tandy software uses DeskMate to provide the user interface via a runtime version of the operating environment for those without it. This includes Activision's The Music Studio and a version of Lotus 1-2-3.

== DeskMate 1.0 ==
DeskMate version 1.0 was included with the original Tandy 1000 and did not work correctly on non-Tandy computers. This was mainly due to the use of the function keys - as most non-Tandy PCs either did not come with an F12 button or with one that did not act in the same way as a Tandy F12 function key (Tandy adopted F11/F12 before IBM did).

DeskMate was popular, increasing sales of the Tandy 1000 to homes and schools.

== DeskMate 2 ==
By the time Personal DeskMate was released with the Tandy 1000 EX, it was a GUI that acted as a portal for many other office productivity applications. The DeskMate application would run on top of MS-DOS. The user interface was made up of text. The applications that made up the suite were:

- a basic word processor ("Text")
- a spreadsheet ("Worksheet")
- a calendar
- a basic database program ("Filer")

The programs all fit on a 360K floppy disk. With careful manipulation, it was possible to isolate the individual applications and remove the others, placing them on separate floppies to be swapped when required. DeskMate was still required, as the individual programs could not be accessed directly.

=== Professional DeskMate ===
For corporate users, Tandy offered Professional DeskMate which includes LocalTalk-based file-service and email extensions. This variant was renamed to "Workgroup Companion" for later versions. Tandy marketed Professional DeskMate for all MS-DOS computers, not just its own.

== DeskMate 3 ==
DeskMate 3 added a number of basic applications:

- a drawing program ("Draw")
- a simple digital audio editing program ("Sound")
- a simple music program ("Music"), which could play music with audio samples created in Sound, used the 3-channel Tandy DAC, which provided 22 kHz 8-bit audio.
- an online service ("PC Link")

The core parts of DeskMate (and DOS) were shipped in ROM on certain Tandy 1000s, allowing the computer to boot into DeskMate within a few seconds.

This was the first version of DeskMate that allowed for a run-time version that could be distributed with applications. This allowed users to use DeskMate applications on their PCs even if they did not have DeskMate installed.

== WinMate ==
This was a complete rewrite for Microsoft Windows 3.1, providing a simplified user interface and a few applications.

== Reception ==
Noting that Tandy had found that Personal DeskMate increased sales of its 1000 computers, Stewart Alsop II in 1988 praised Tandy's strategy for Professional DeskMate as "brilliant: while IBM, Apple, and virtually the rest of the computing world focus almost exclusively on corporate and government business", Tandy "responds to the basic needs of small businesses and professional offices".
