= Fairway =

Fairway may refer to:

- Fairway (golf), part of a golf course
- Fairway (navigation), a part of a water body with navigable channel
- Fairway (horse), a Thoroughbred racehorse
- Fairway, Gauteng, South Africa
- Fairway, Kansas, United States
- Fairway, Lexington, neighborhood in Lexington, Kentucky, United States
- Fairway Market, an American grocery chain based mostly in New York City
- Fairway Markets, a grocery chain on Vancouver Island in British Columbia, Canada
- Fairway, a version of London's Austin FX4 taxicab

== See also ==
- Farway, a small village and civil parish in the East Devon district of Devon, England
- Fairway Rock, an islet in the Bering Strait
- Faraway (disambiguation)
- Fareway, a grocery store chain in Boone, Iowa
