= Fire Away =

Fire Away or fireaway, may refer to:

- fire at will, weapons free, fire when ready

== Music ==
=== Albums ===
- Fire Away (album), by Ozomatli, 2010
- Fire Away, a 2007 album and the title song from Kill the Alarm

=== Songs ===
- "Fire Away" (song), by Chris Stapleton from Traveller, 2015
- "Fire AWay", a 1982 song by Captain and Tennille off the album More Than Dancing
- "Fire Away", a 1996 song by Garageland off the album Last Exit to Garageland
- "Fire Away", a 2003 song by Gyroscope from Midnight Express
- "Fire Away", a 2004 tune from the videogame Devil May Cry 2, released on Devil May Cry 2 Original Soundtrack; see Music of the Devil May Cry series
- "Fire Away", a 2007 song by Jupiter One from their eponymous album
- "Fire Away", a 2007 song by Sullivan off the album Cover Your Eyes
- "Fire Away", a 2009 song by The Swellers off the album Ups and Downsizing
- "Fire Away", a 2010 song by Ryan Adams off the album Orion
- "Fire Away", a 2011 song by Takida off the album The Burning Heart
- "Fire Away", a 2011 song by Dawes off the album Nothing Is Wrong
- "Fire Away", a 2012 song by David Gravell
- "Fire Away", a 2013 song by Jon McLaughlin off the album Holding My Breath
- "Fire Away", a 2013 song by Lee DeWyze off the album Frames
- "Fire Away" (Skrillex song), a 2014 song by Skrillex off the album Recess
- "Fire Away", a 2014 song by Tedashii off the album Below Paradise
- "Fire Away", a 2015 song by Rey Pila from The Future Sugar
- "Fire Away" (Niall Horan song), a 2017 song by Niall Horan off the album Flicker
- "Fire Away", a 2018 single by Paris & Simo
- "Fire Away", a 2018 single by Dirty Honey
- "Fire Away", a single by Shonlock
- "Fireaway", a 1989 song by James off the single Come Home

== Comics ==
- Fire Away (book), a DC Comics compilation comic book volume for Doom Patrol
- "Fire Away" (chapter), a chapter of PvP (webcomic)
- "Fire Away" (Japanese: 撃ちまくれ, Uchimakure), chapter 92 of The Promised Netherland Japanese manga serial comic; see List of The Promised Neverland chapters
- Fire Away (cartoonist work), a comic work by Chris von Szombathy nominated for the Doug Wright Award

== Other uses ==
- Fire Away (game), a handheld electronic games marketed by Tandy beginning in the 1980s
- Fire Away (Tiremm Innanz), a painting by Gaetano Previati
- "Fire Away" (episode), a 2019 animated TV episode of The Stinky & Dirty Show
- "Fire Away" (episode), 2012 season 2 number 10 episode 21 of Mob Wives; see List of Mob Wives episodes
- Fireaway (horse), a racehorse who competed at the 1861 Melbourne Cup
- Fireaway Pizza, a British takeaway pizza chain

== See also ==
- Away (disambiguation)
- Fire (disambiguation)
