= Faraway =

Faraway may refer to:

== Music ==
- "Faraway (Hoshi ni Negai o)", a song by Gackt, 2009
- "Faraway", a song by Jay Chou from Still Fantasy
- "Faraway", a song by Miz
- "Faraway", a song from Little Busters!
- "Faraway Vol. 2", a song by Apocalyptica from Reflections

== Places ==
- Faraway How, a nunatak in Greenland
- Faraway, two homesteads in Western Australia

== Other uses ==
- Faraway: Puzzle Escape, a 2017 video game
- Faraway Farm, a historic home near Martinsburg, West Virginia, US
- Empire Faraway, a UK Empire ship

== See also ==
- Far Away (disambiguation)
- Far Far Away (disambiguation)
