= John Ellenby =

British businessman

- Born: 9 January 1941; Corbridge, Northumberland, England
- Died: 17 August 2016 (aged 75); San Francisco, United States
- Occupation: Businessman
- Known for: Grid Compass computers

John Ellenby (9 January 1941 – 17 August 2016) was a British businessman. He was the founder of Grid Systems Corporation, maker of the Grid Compass, one of the first commercially successful laptop computers. He also co-founded GeoVector, an early augmented reality company.

== Biography ==
Ellenby was born in Corbridge, in Northumberland, England. His father Conrad Ellenby was a nematologist. He studied geography and economics at University College London, and first encountered mainframe computers for the first time in the early 1960s, when he spent a year at the London School of Economics. He worked for the British firm Ferranti, where he worked on minicomputers. Ellenby moved to California in the 1970s, where he worked for Xerox, and became involved in the management of the development of the Alto and Alto II desktop computers. In 1978, Ellenby and Tim Mott proposed an idea to commercialise the Alto computer, but this idea was later abandoned due to financial constraints. Ellenby said that they "had to sandbag the Alto because with it we couldn't make their numbers and therefore wouldn't get any bonuses".

In 1979, he cofounded Grid Systems Corporation with colleagues from Xerox PARC; the business started with $13 million of funding from Wall Street venture capitalists. In 1982, Grid built the Grid Compass, which was one of the first laptop computers to feature the now-popular clamshell design, and was used on the Space Shuttle Challenger in 1986. In 1988, Grid was sold to the Tandy Corporation. The design for The Compass computer was allegedly based on the shape of Ellenby's briefcase. In 1987, Ellenby founded Agilis Corporation; he acted as the President of the company until 1990, and in 1989 the company produced hand-held computers with built-in Ethernet ports. Ellenby also founded Geovector, a company based on applications of augmented reality. Ellenby died on 17 August 2016 in San Francisco.
