= Computer City =

US-based computer superstore chain

- Type: Subsidiary
- Founded: 1981; 45 years ago
- Defunct: 1998
- Fate: Closed
- Headquarters: Costa Mesa, California, U.S.
- Parent: Tandy Corporation

Computer City was a chain of United States–based computer superstores operated by Tandy Corporation; the retailer was sold to CompUSA in 1998 and was merged into the CompUSA organization.

Computer City was a supercenter concept featuring name-brand and private label computers, software and related products; at the height of its success the company had over 101 locations in the United States and five in Europe.

== History ==
On April 15, 1979, the original Computer City was founded by Leonard (Len) and Myrna Simon in Santa Ana, California. Len Simon sat on the original Apple Dealer Advisory Council while Myrna was in charge of Purchasing, Distribution, and HR. Within the first two years, Computer City had added stores in Brea and Pasadena, California, and with the help of managers Mike Mostyn, Gordon Klatt and Greg Gadbois, Computer City expanded to Orange, San Diego, Beverly Hills, Encino, Cerritos, and Torrance, California. Computer City was the first independent Los Angeles authorized computer retailer to offer the original IBM 5150 PC along with Sears and ComputerLand.

Computer City and Computer Mart in Troy, MI operated by Rick and Joe Inatome merged in 1983 and went public in January 1984, as Inacomp Cmputer Centers. Inacomp, became the second largest computer retailer in the US with sales over $500 million ($1.36 billion in 2025) / year in computer products.

By 1985, market conditions in computer retailing had changed. As computers were less of a mystery to more people, profit margins began to drop. Retailers who offered business-to-business consultative services to sell computer systems could no longer afford expensive salespeople. Taking the name of the Los Angeles retailer they had purchased two years earlier, Rick, Vee, and Joe Inatome gave rise to the first big-box merchandising concept – Computer City. With an investment from Mitsubishi, Joe leveraged his vendor relationships at Inacomp to bring IBM, Apple, and Compaq to their first big-box merchandised store, initially privately held by Inatome and Mitsubishi.

=== Innovative retail practices ===
Computer City innovated a number of retail concepts that are now common retail practices. First begun at the Costa Mesa Inacomp, the store hosted a professional service bureau called The Graphic Zone, that provided film and graphic services for the nascent desktop publishing industry, the store operated a cafe which served coffee and sandwiches to prolong shopping visits, and the store featured a product training center that included an Electrosonic Video Wall, with 16 32" monitors which served as digital signage for the store, when training wasn't in session. The store also made heavy use of vendor-managed inventory, vendor shops, and CO-OP funded retail displays which are now common practice throughout the retail industry.

=== Acquisition by Tandy ===
Ultimately, Tandy bought the Computer City concept and store in 1991 and launched Computer City as a national chain (as well as Incredible Universe). Alan Bush, a Radio Shack executive, was named president of the new company.

The stores resembled CompUSA's super center concepts, but lacked the financial backing CompUSA had. CompUSA, having a larger market share, bought the company, and in the process, shut down one of its smaller competitors. Two types of store models existed, one was a full size store with an in house Tandy Repair Center similar to a freestanding Tandy Repair Center (later RadioShack Service Centers) that continued to serve RadioShack stores. These stores had sub-departments for business sales that would just handle business orders for companies and other organizations, they also offered in store customer training classes for software such as Microsoft Excel, Word, and PowerPoint. Some of these locations were as big as some Best Buy Stores. They also operated Computer City Express stores which had no service center in them, nor did they offer classes. They were closer in size to a large RadioShack store. Computer City was recognized as the 2nd fastest retailer to hit $1 billion in sales in 1995 and in 1996 was recognized as the 2nd fastest retailer to hit $2 billion in sales. (Sam's Club was the fastest retailer to hit $1 billion.) Alan Bush, Computer City's President/Chief Executive and the Driving Force of Mass Retail Computer Retailing along with Jim Hamilton Vice President GMM (known as the Father of Computer Retailing), were the strategists behind the rapid growth and success.

In its Westbury/Garden City, New York, location, Computer City opened right next to its main competitor CompUSA. In King Of Prussia, Pennsylvania, Computer City was directly across the street from CompUSA, and was in plain sight from CompUSA's main entrance. However, Computer City's entrance opened toward an off-street parking lot.

As both Computer City and Tandy's other venture Incredible Universe were both having financial issues, the computer departments of Incredible Universe were changed to Computer City.

The Westbury, New York, Incredible Universe was also within three miles of the above-mentioned CompUSA and Computer City. This may have hurt both of these Tandy divisions.

One hallmark of Computer City's retail concept is that the store operated much like a grocery store; customers could not only browse, but select and purchase almost all merchandise without the assistance of a salesperson. Furthermore, until mid-1996, the floor staff did not have revenue quotas and were not paid on commission, though bonuses were applied for selling either the extended warranty Computer City Service Plan (CCSP) or in-store training classes. In retrospect, this model was seen as creating a competitive disadvantage, as computers were still new to many customers in those days and a lack of qualified and knowledgeable salespeople, who had no incentive to self-improve, led to frustrated customers and high return rates. In late 1996. Computer City announced they would be closing 21 stores.

=== Acquisition by CompUSA ===
On June 22, 1998, CompUSA announced that it was purchasing the Computer City chain for $275 million ($506 million in 2025). Upon completion of the takeover in September 1998, CompUSA shuttered fifty-one of the stores outright, and transitioned the remainders into CompUSA locations.

In some states, warranties on items that had been purchased at Computer City were taken over by CompUSA, in other states they were taken over by Radio Shack.

In Canada, Computer City Canada stores were sold by CompUSA to Future Shop who, in the end, liquidated all Canadian Computer City locations.

== Current uses of the name ==
There was an active store in Bermuda by the same name; it was independently founded in January 2000 and closed in December 2012. It was never related to the US or Canadian stores.

Until around 2015 there were stores in Denmark (10 stores) and Sweden (2 stores) using the original logo. There are also active stores by this name in other parts of the world.

== See also ==
- PC Club
