= Away =

Away may refer to:

== Film and television ==
- Away (2016 film), a British film directed by David Blair
- Away (2019 film), a Latvian animated silent film by Gints Zilbalodis
- Away (2025 film), a drama film by Gerard Oms
- Away (TV series), a 2020 American science fiction drama

== Literature ==
- Away (play), a 1986 play by Michael Gow
- Away, a 2007 novel by Amy Bloom
- Away, a 1980 collection of poems by Andrew Salkey

== Music ==
=== Albums ===
- Away (album), by Okkervil River, 2016
- Away, by Dntel, 2021

=== Songs ===
- "Away" (Ayra Starr song), 2021
- "Away" (Enrique Iglesias song), 2008
- "Away" (Fatin Shidqia song), 2015
- "Away" (Oxlade song), 2020
- "Away", by Quavo from Qrömelife, 2026
- "Away", by Before the Dawn from The Ghost, 2006
- "Away", by Breaking Benjamin from We Are Not Alone, 2004
- "Away", by the Cranberries from No Need to Argue, 2002 reissue
- "Away", by Devin Townsend from Accelerated Evolution, 2003
- "Away", by Davido from Timeless, 2023
- "Away", by the Feelies from Only Life, 1988
- "Away", by G.E.M. from Heartbeat, 2015
- "Away", by Neurosis from Times of Grace, 1999
- "Away", by Nightwish from Over the Hills and Far Away, 2001
- "Away", by Of Mice & Men from Cold World, 2016
- "Away", by Swallow the Sun from Songs from the North I, II & III, 2015
- "Away", by Toadies from Rubberneck, 1994
- "Away!", by Wuthering Heights from Salt, 2010

== Video games ==
- Away: Shuffle Dungeon, a 2008 action role-playing game

== Other uses ==
- Away (company), a luggage retailer
- Away (sports), or road games, played away from a team's home venue
- Away3D, an open-source platform for developing interactive 3D graphics
- Away, Rajasthan, a village in India
- Gil Brother (1957–2023), known as Away, Brazilian humorist
- Michel Langevin (born 1963), known as Away, drummer for Voivod

== See also ==
- "Away Away Away", a song by the Hollies from Butterfly
- Awaye!, an Australian radio program
- So Far Away (disambiguation)
