= Fern Valley =

Fern Valley might refer to:

== Arboretums ==
- Fern Valley, a section of the Edith J. Carrier Arboretum in Harrisonburg, Virginia
- Fern Valley Native Plant Collections, one of the major gardens in the United States National Arboretum

== Locations ==
=== Australia ===
- Fern Valley homestead, see List of homesteads in Western Australia: D–F

=== Canada ===
- Fern Valley Trailer Park, Alberta

=== United Kingdom ===
- Fern Valley, a valley overseen by the National Trust of Jersey

=== United States ===
- Fern Valley, California
- Fern Valley Township, Palo Alto County, Iowa
