= Mario Aleppo =

British-Syrian entrepreneur

- Born: 16 November 1989 (age 36); Mitcham, South London, UK
- Occupation: entrepreneur
- Known for: Founder of Fireaway Pizza
- Website: marioaleppo.com

Mario Aleppo (born 16 November 1989) is a British-Italian entrepreneur and the chief executive officer of Fireaway Pizza, a pizza restaurant chain based in London, England.

== Early life and education ==
Aleppo was born in Mitcham, South London, as the eldest of five children to Francesca Aleppo and Christopher Murphy. He attended St. Peter & Paul’s Primary School in Mitcham and later The John Fisher High School in Purley. He left school at the age of 16.

== Career ==
After leaving school, Aleppo briefly worked at Nando's before attempting to establish his own coffee shop in Tooting, London, in 2013. The business closed after six months. In 2016, Aleppo founded Fireaway Pizza Ltd and has served as its chief executive officer since its inception. His company won the Small Pizza Chain of the Year award at the Pizza and Pasta Awards (PAPA) in 2019. In 2021, Aleppo received the Rising Star Award at the same event. In 2022, he was named Food & Drink Entrepreneur of the Year at the Great British Entrepreneur Awards (GBEA).

In November 2021, Aleppo donated over 1,000 pizzas to emergency workers and homeless charities in Worcester.
