= Fire Away (game) =

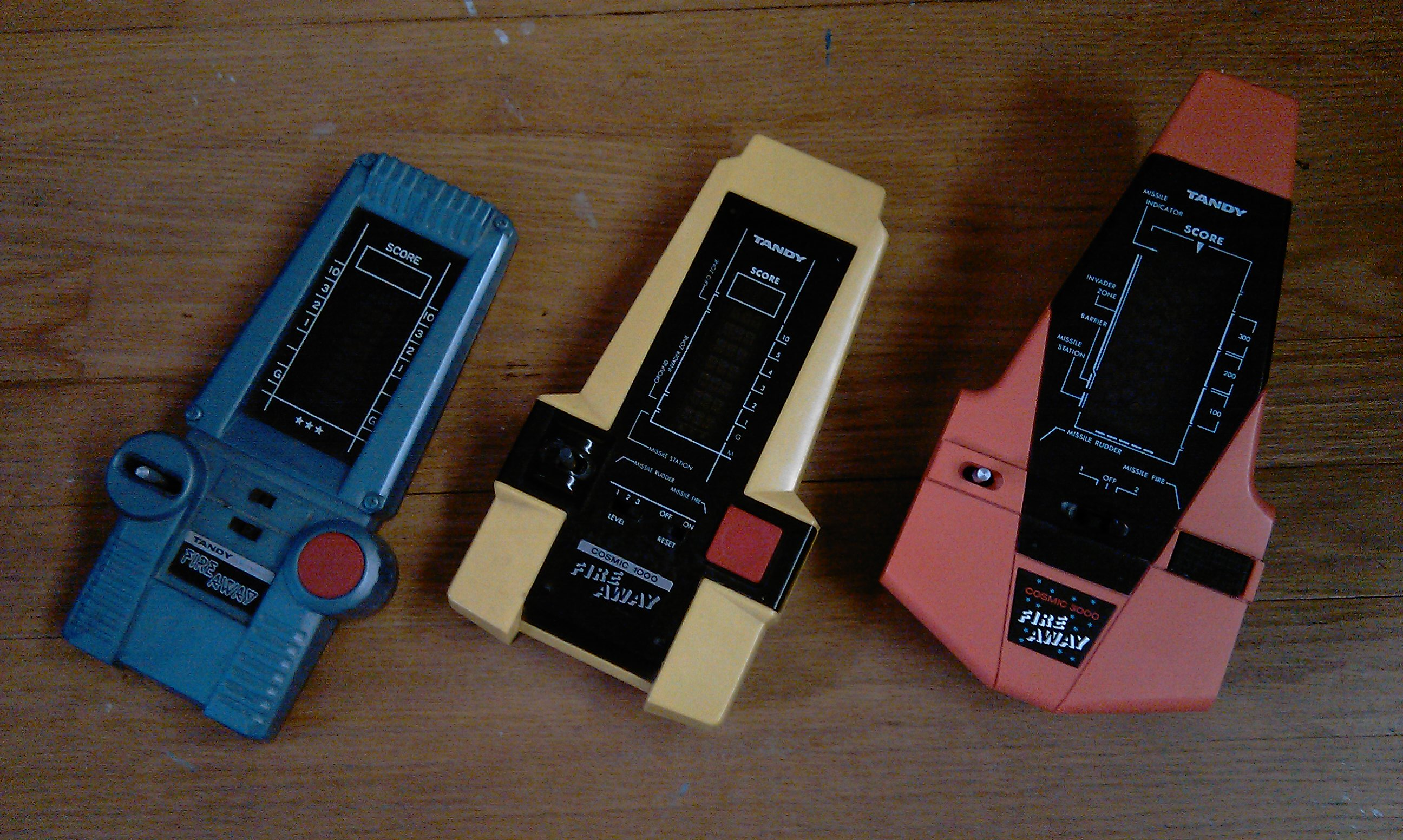
- Fire Away, Cosmic 1000 Fire Away, and the Cosmic 3000 Fire Away
- Developers: Gakken; Hanzawa
- Publisher: Tandy
- Platform: Handheld
- Genre: Fixed shooter

Fire Away was a series of handheld electronic games marketed by Tandy (the parent of the Radio Shack and Tandy electronics chains) beginning in the 1980s.

In all, there were six different products in the line, nearly all of which were actually licensed by Tandy rather than being original Tandy games. The games looked to capitalize on the popularity of the video game Space Invaders which was released in 1978.

== History ==
Fire Away was the first Tandy game to hold the name. Released in 1981, Tandy licensed the game from the Japanese company Gakken who created and sold the game under the name Invader. The game was also licensed to Computer Games Limited (CGL) as Galaxy Invader and by Vanity Fair as Electron Blaster. The game, regardless of the company, was essentially the same. A joystick was used by the player's left hand to move the gun base to the left and right. A large red button used by the player's right hand fired the missiles. There were three settings, 1, 2, and 3, which adjusted the game speed, with '3' being the fastest. There were seven tiers on the plastic screen which covered the VFD display. The bottom tier, labeled "G", was where the base moved. The two tiers above this had no label while the remaining tiers were marked 1, 2, 3, and 10. The numbers referred to the points earned when the player eliminated the invader. The 10 point tier was populated by a UFO that appeared every 15 shots, moving across the top. The invaders themselves would populate within the remaining point earning tiers, two at a time. They would drop bombs and move down towards the player's base. If the invader reached the "G" tier, the game ended (although a glitch meant that holding down the fire button 'immunized' the player against an alien that reached the "G" tier. After a few seconds, the alien vanished and the player could continue). Three hits on the base by bombs would end the game. Once the player reached 199 points, the game ended in victory for the player. Both the Tandy and Vanity Fair versions of the game used a blue housing while the Gakken and CGL games used a white housing. The game used four AA batteries and the LED made the invaders, etc. appear blue. The original retail price was $39.95.

The following year, in 1982, Tandy introduced the next Fire Away under the title Cosmic 1000 Fire Away. Like the first game, Tandy licensed it from Gakken who sold the game as Galaxy Invader 1000 while CGL also licensed the game, selling it under the same name as Gakken. The principle of the new game remained the same but with improvements in the case design and adding some changes to the game play. Another tier was added for a total of eight. The missile station was on the tier marked "M" with the Ground ("G") being the next tier up. The remaining tiers were again points earned, starting at 1, 2, 3, 4, 5, and 10. These tiers were marked as the "Invader Zone" while the top tier was the "UFO Zone". The player now had to obtain 999 points and had a finite number of missiles to launch at the invaders (250 missiles). The player earned a bonus missile station and 50 more missiles if he or she reached 700 points. When the missile count got low, the game made a warning sound. The game ended when 999 points was reached, or all missile station were destroyed, or the invader reached the "G" tier, or the player ran out of missiles. The UFO flew in random patterns, to cause the player to expend missiles through misses. Four AA batteries provided power with the LED colored so that the missile station, the invaders, their bombs, and the score were blue while the player's missiles, the UFO, and hits on the missile station and invaders appeared red. The retail price increased to $59.95.

In 1983, Tandy introduced the Cosmic 2000 Fire Away and it was a departure from the design of the previous two games. This may have been due to Tandy licensing the game from a different company, in this case, Hanzawa, rather than through Gakken. Actronics also licensed the game from Hanzawa, marketing it under the name Twinvader III. The case was shaped to resemble an arcade game and the joystick was replaced with left and right buttons. The order of the main controls were also reversed with the fire button being on the left and the missile station (called a fortress in this version) movement controls on the right. As the name suggests, the player had to score 2,000 points in order to win. The score counter, however, had only three places so when the player reached the first 999 points, it would then reset to 000 and continue until the next 999 was reached, ending the game upon the next point. Like the previous two games, there were three modes of difficulty. A new invader was added in which, upon being hit, would split into two. Waves were introduced, called convoys, which were composed of 10 invaders. 5 invaders could be on the playing field at one time. There was a demo mode which would run the game on its own and also a mute button. Tandy's version used a blue case while Actronics used a brown case. The player gained victory after destroying 15 convoys (150 invaders) or earns 2,000 points and the player lost if all fortresses are destroyed or one of the invaders lands. Every 1,000 points earned the player a bonus fortress. The game used four C batteries or could be played using an AC adapter. Retail price was $39.95.

1984 saw the introduction of the Tandy Cosmic 3000 Fire Away game. Like the first two games, this was a licensed product from Gakken and thus it used the same basic styling as its fore bearers. Gakken marketed their game as Galaxy Invader 2000. The tiers were reduced to six and included the missile station, a "barrier", and four invader zones. The points were also changed so that, tier depending, the player could earn 100, 200, or 300 points depending on where he or she hit the invader. Gone was the UFO. The player could only have 1 missile in flight on the board at one time but there were barriers which were destroyed when hit by invader bombs (much like Space Invaders) and these barriers would renew once a wave of invaders was destroyed. Unlike Space Invaders, the player's missiles did not destroy the barrier. There were only two difficulty modes rather than three. To win, the player needed to achieve 10,000 points (which the game could display). The player lost when all three missile stations were destroyed. Unlike the previous games, the player did not lose when the invader reached the bottom of the screen. Akin to the popular arcade game Galaga, the invader would reappear at the top of the game screen and continue to attack. The game required four C batteries but could also use an AC adapter. Retail price was $39.95.

Tandy let the line languish for several years when, in 1989, they introduced LCD Fire Away. The big change was the replacement of the LED for a LCD. The game was also smaller and used a similar control layout as Cosmic 2000 Fire Away did. It also had a much lower price point, retailing for $12.95. Due to the reduced power needs, LCD Fire Away was able to use watch batteries rather than AA or C batteries. Tandy/Radio Shack would repackage the same game as Invasion Force and later, in 1990, as Jet Fighter. LCD Fire Away and its derivatives would be the last of the line.

== Other Tandy Fire Away games ==
In 1981, Bandai marketed a game called Flight Time (in France, the game box read Pilote de Chasse though the game itself still said Flight Time) which Tandy licensed as Fire Away. While carrying the same name, the original Bandai game used aircraft rather than alien invaders which set it apart from the Fire Away line. This game was only sold in the UK.

One of the 12 games in the Tandy-12 Computerized Arcade system is named Fire Away

In 1983, Tandy licensed Nelsonic's 1981 watch game Space Attacker under the name Cosmic Fire Away Game Watch. Tandy retailed it for $29.95. The same game was sold by Collins Industrial as the Star Trek II:Wrath of Khan Video Game Watch while Majestron released the watch as Cosmic Wars.
