= Mind Thrust =

1981 video game

- Developer: Hayden Microcomputers
- Publisher: Tandy Corporation
- Platform: TRS-80
- Release: 1981
- Genre: Board game

Mind Thrust is a 1981 video game published by Tandy Corporation.

== Gameplay ==
Mind Thrust is a game in which the player defeats the computer by either removing all playing pieces of the opponent, or by creating a chain of pieces that covers the width of the board.

== Reception ==
Barbour Stokes reviewed the game for Computer Gaming World, and stated that "The rules and plays of Mind Thrust are easily and quickly learned making it an excellent home demonstration game to make believers out of those non-gamers and non-computerists that may drop in."
