= GridCase =

Line of rugged tablets and laptops

GRiDCASE
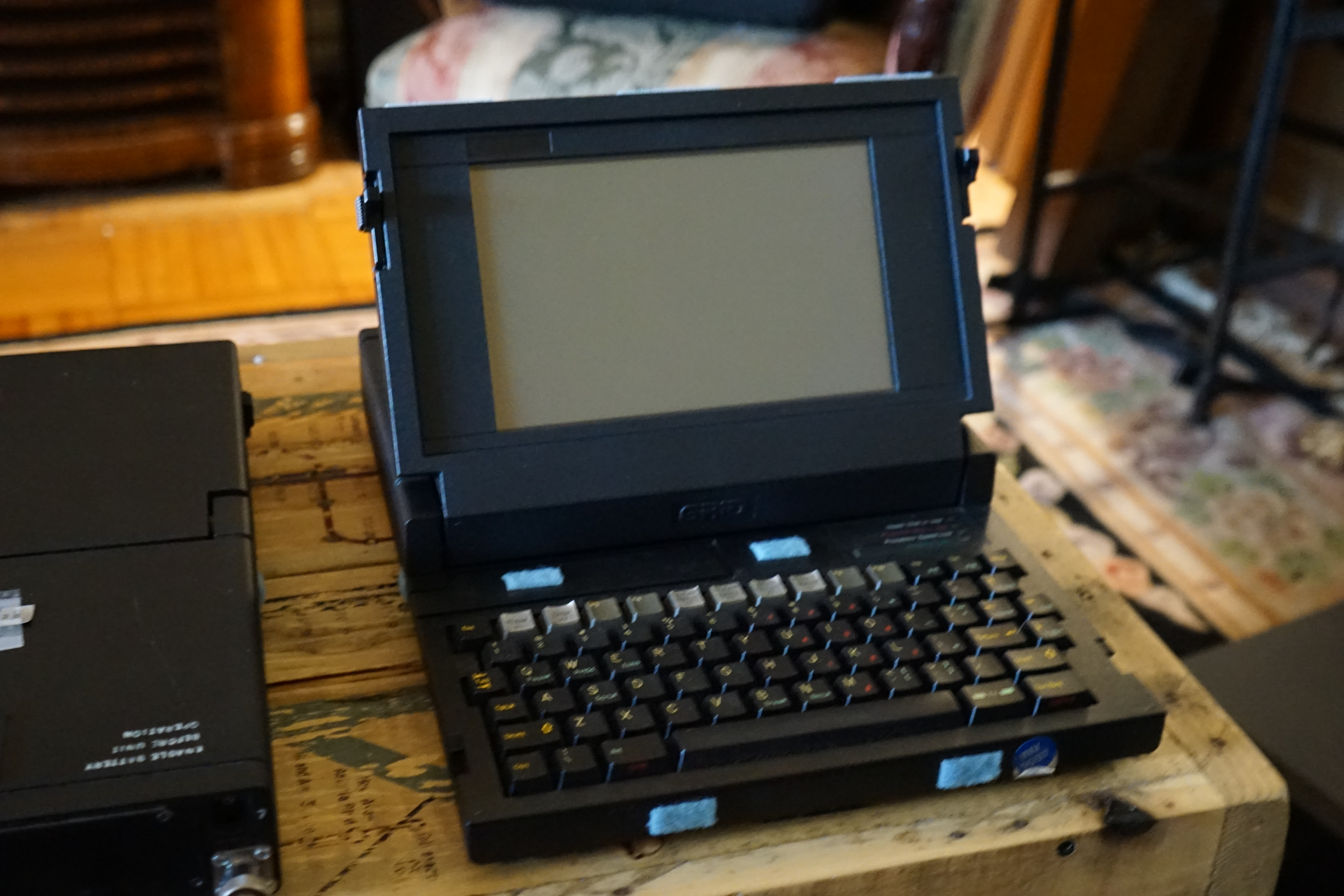
- GridCase 1537EXP
- Also known as: GRiD Case , Portable Sagem (France only)
- Developer: Grid Systems Corporation (1985–1988); Tandy/GRiD Computer Systems (1988–1990); GRiD Defence Systems (1995–present)
- Type: Laptop/Tablet PC
- Released: 1985; 41 years ago
- Predecessor: Grid Compass II
- Website: https://www.griduk.com/products/

GridCase (stylized as GRiDCASE) is a line of rugged tablets and laptops by Grid Systems Corporation released as a successor of the GRiD Compass line. The first model was released in 1985.

GRiDCASE models
		1980's					1990's										2000's	2010's	2020's
		1985	1986	1987	1988	1989	1990	1991	1992	1993	1994	1995	1996	1997	1998	1999	2000's	2010's	2020's
Laptops
Regular rugged		2	3		1520	1530	1550	Tandy GRiD laptops				1580			—N/a				
Fully rugged	Subnotebook	—N/a																1510	
Fully rugged	Regular size	—N/a	Tempest		—N/a		1535; 1537	Tandy GRiD laptops				1580T (Tempest)			1580 XGA		1590		1513; 1590
Fully rugged	Desktop replacement	—N/a																	1595
Other
Fully rugged	Tablets	—N/a																2500 series	
Fully rugged	Rackmount PC's	—N/a																	9161U

== Models ==
=== Former line ===
==== GRiDCASE 2 ====
1985; low-contrast LCD screen with green background (instead of orange/yellow plasma screen with black background on a Compass laptops).

This model was based on a MSDOS 2.11 and a bunch of apps burned on ROM that fit in the ROM tray in front.

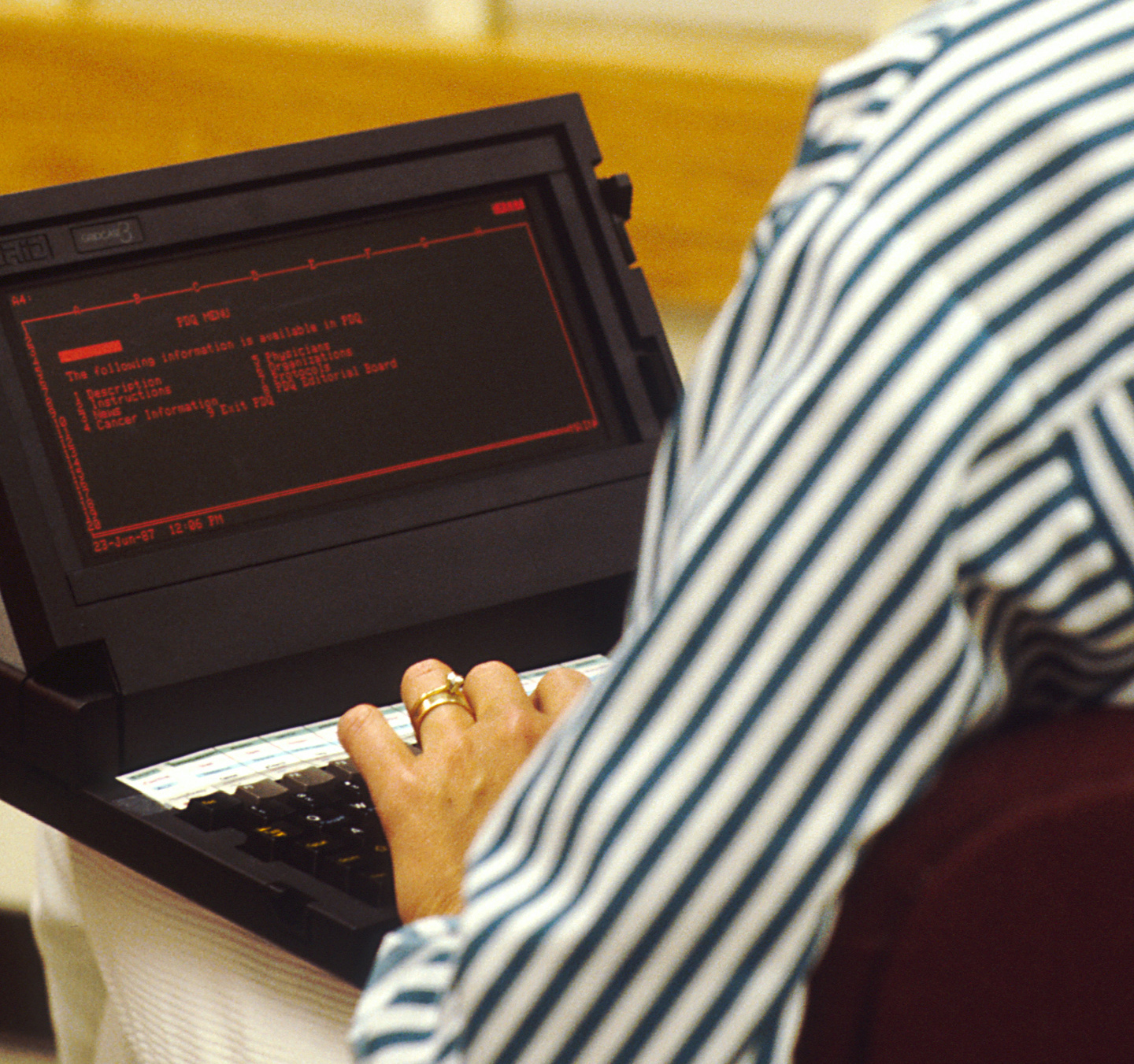
GRiDCASE 3 with red plasma screen

==== GRiDCASE 3 ====
1986; returning to a plasma screens (but with red/orange text color and wide aspect ratio). The internal power supply can be ejected and a battery-pack is installed in its place.

3D view: http://vintage-laptops.com/en/grid-case-3

===== GRiDCASE 3 Tempest =====
1986; the rugged version of GRiDCASE 3 with electromagnetic protection.

3D view: http://vintage-laptops.com/en/grid-case-tempest

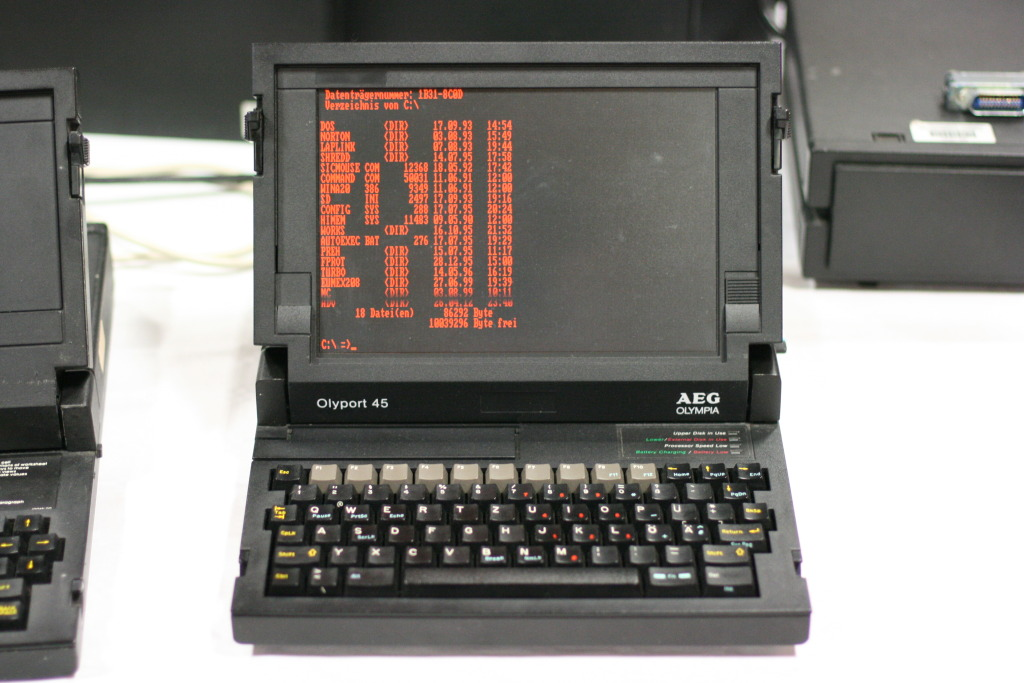
AEG Olympia Olyport 45, rebranded GRiDCASE 1520

==== GRiDCASE 1520 ====
1988; can be equipped with plasma or LCD screen.

Was based on a 286 CPU.

3D view: http://vintage-laptops.com/en/grid-case-1520

==== GRiDCASE 1530 ====
GridCase 1535EXP
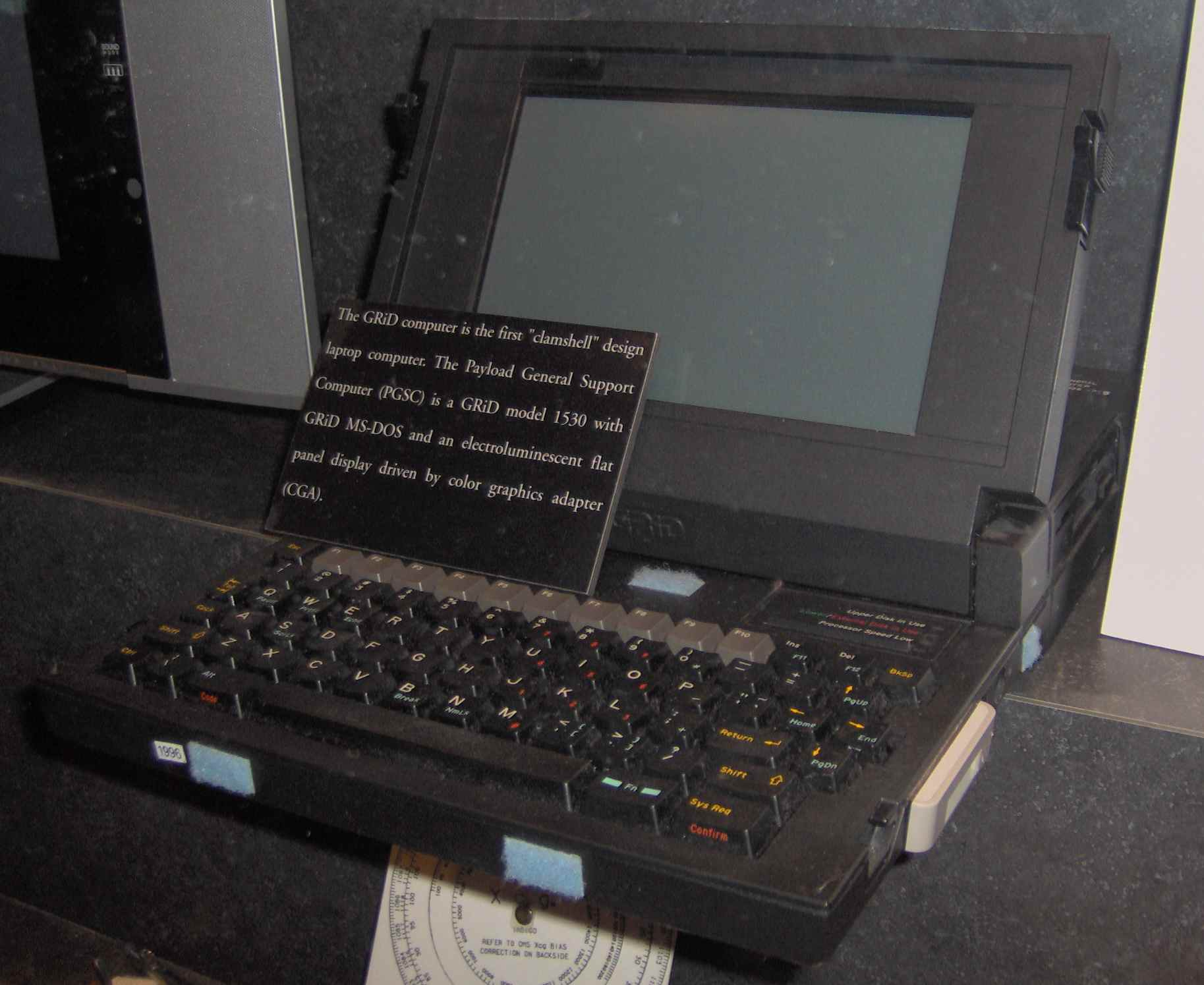
- GridCase 1530 series laptop
- CPU: Intel 80386 (Intel 80387 optional)
- Connectivity: DIN-5 Keyboard, Phone line, RS-232, Parallel, External peripheral, Video, Power 16 V DC

The modification of 1530 – the Grid GRiDCASE 1535EXP is a rugged laptop with a 80386 CPU, an optional 80387 floating-point processor and up to 8 Mbyte of DRAM. It was first flown into space in December 1992 on the STS-53 for use of the HERCULES geolocation device. The 1535EXP was also the first rugged portable PC to attain full TEMPEST accreditation from the NSA.

Another modification – the Grid GRiDCASE 1537EXP – has another screen (640×480 instead of 640×400, but with less physical size).

The power input is 100–240 V AC 50/60/400 Hz, 80 W. The 400 Hz utility frequency is common on airplanes and submarines.

3D view: http://vintage-laptops.com/en/grid-case-1537e

==== GRiDCASE 1550 ====
1990; This model has an integrated pointing device, and was based on an Intel 80386sx processor.

The 1550sx version has 4 MB RAM, a 100 MB hard disk, a 1.44 MB floppy drive, a hardly visible B/W VGA-LCD screen, a built in 2400 bps modem and weights 5.5 kg (12 lbs.) without battery or power supply.

3D view: http://vintage-laptops.com/en/grid-case-1550sx

=== Tandy GRiD laptops ===
In the period from 1990–1994, the Tandy Corporation together with GRiD Systems Corporation produced the following models:

GRiD 1450SX – 3D view: http://vintage-laptops.com/en/grid-1450sx

GRiD 1810 – 3D view: http://vintage-laptops.com/en/grid-1810

GRiD 1660 and 1660C – 3D view: http://vintage-laptops.com/en/grid-1660

GRiD 1680 and 1680C – 3D view: http://vintage-laptops.com/en/grid-1680

GRiD 1720, 1750, 1755 – 3D view: http://vintage-laptops.com/en/grid-1755

GRiD 4025N and 4025NC – 3D view: http://vintage-laptops.com/en/grid-4025nc

=== GRiD Defence Systems GRiDCASE ===
Reintroduced in 1995 line.

==== GRiDCASE 1580 ====
There is also a Tempest version of this model (1580T).

Pentium and pointing stick (initial model, 1995) or Pentium II and touchpad (1580 XGA, 1998).

3D view: http://vintage-laptops.com/en/grid-case-1580

3D view: http://vintage-laptops.com/en/grid-case-1580-tempest

3D view: https://vintage-laptops.com/en/grid-case-1580-XGA

== See also ==
- GridPad

Preceded by Grid Compass	GridCase; 1985–1990, 1995–present
