= GeoVector =

Virtual reality company

Coordinates: 37°45′44.96″N 122°23′25.42″W

GeoVector Corporation
- Headquarters: San Francisco, CA, United States
- Area served: Worldwide
- Website: www.geovector.com

GeoVector Corporation (originally named Criticom Corporation) began conducting research into augmented reality in early 1990s. The company, co-founded by John Ellenby, who also founded laptop pioneer GRiD Systems Corporation, devised a method to use sensors in a device to associate relevant digital information with places on earth.

The basic concept around which most of GeoVector's R&D has focused is that knowing the position and orientation of the device allows the application to provide digital information associated with a place in the real world. Position and direction data can be used to create a virtual vector which intersects with objects indexed in databases by their latitude and longitude coordinates.

GeoVector's first patent in this domain, since issued as 5,815,411, was filed September 10, 1993. The company originally held the trademark for "Augmented Reality" (issued in 1995) but abandoned it as the term was generally adopted to describe this technique.

Early GeoVector work focused on providing vertical solutions. One GeoVector augmented reality design used compass equipped binoculars along with GPS to superimpose nautical maps on the visual horizon thus improving the safety of navigation.

A video showing early Augmented Reality concepts from GeoVector can be seen here

GeoVector then discovered that their basic technology would improve the user experience on handheld devices delivering location aware applications. In this instance, actually viewing the real object was not necessary. Simply being able to refine the search for location information by knowing the direction of user interest or the specific object of his attention would be a significant benefit. The GeoVector team then implemented what they now refer to as the "pointing" feature.

In 1998, "Clipper" project was initiated. The company built a prototype device known internally as The "Little Guy", a handheld "pointable" information appliance independent of a visual or video element. Since that time GeoVector has worked closely with sensor and device manufactures to encourage them to include GPS and compass elements in their products. In early 2006, there were sufficient pointing capable handsets in Japan for GeoVector to launch its first commercial product on the KDDI network with support of local partners NECM and Mapion.

A video showing the functionality of Pointing is on YouTube.

The company has continued its research and development in directional searching and augmented reality and has been awarded several patents in those areas. Further information about their intellectual property can be found on line at their website patent gallery.

== Milestones and events ==
- September 10, 1993, first augmented reality patent filed.
- May 1998 the World's first pointing search platform, "Little Guy," debuts.
- January 2002 – Inclusion of GeoVector article The Pointing Wireless Device for Delivery of Location Based Applications (Pamela Kerwin et al.) Article in Book The Application of DSPs in Mobile Communications (Gatherer and Auslander)
- In 2002 GeoVector contracted Socket Communications to make PCMCIA cards equipped with GPS and Compass, GeoVector Pointing Cards, for use in Pocket PCs. See the card in action here.
- Microsoft .NET case study in 2002. Welcome to New Zealand Pocket PC application demonstrates the power of the .NET Compact Framework when combined with GPS and Heading Sensors
- In 2003 GeoVector created a location-based game, Real World Doom, allowing people to fight monsters on the streets of Auckland.
- 2003: GeoVector along with partners Vodafone, HP, Microsoft, Virtual Spectator and Animation Research Ltd showcase Actual Spectatoraugmented reality app at America's Cup Sailing Races in Auckland, New Zealand.
- The San Jose Mercury featured GeoVector on the cover of their business section on September 27, 2004.
- January 2006: GeoVector & Mapion deliver the World's first Pointing Based Search for mobile phones.
- GeoVector on Channel 5 News September 27, 2006.
- Mapion Local Search on the news in Japan.
- The New York Times featured GeoVector on the cover of their business section on June 28, 2006.
- May 2007: GeoVector and Mapion enhance Mapion Local Search and re-brand it Mapion Pointing Appli. See a video of it in action here.
- One Shot Search from NEC Magnus & GeoVector on the news in Japan.
- In October 2008, GeoVector launched the location based game Navimon in Japan
- In September 2009, GeoVector launched World Surfer (TM) for the Android and iOS (iPhone) platforms. Developed for compass-enabled GPS smartphones, World Surfer allows users to point their phones in a particular direction to search for retailers, restaurants and other points of interest.
- February 2010 GeoVector launches World Surfer 2 with augmented reality object view for iPhone 3GS platform.

== Lawsuit against Samsung ==
On November 10, 2016, GeoVector Corporation filed a lawsuit against Samsung Telecommunications America (STA), claiming that Samsung’s Galaxy smart phones and tablets infringed several of GeoVector’s augmented reality patents. Samsung motioned that the liability on Samsung Telecommunications America should be dismissed as it had successfully merged to Samsung Electronics America (SEA) in January 2015. Samsung claimed that Samsung Telecommunications America could not be held liable, as the entity no longer existed. The judge ruled that Samsung Electronics America, as the surviving entity of the merger, should be liable for any claims against Samsung Telecommunications America.

On February 2, 2017, GeoVector Corporation filed a similar lawsuit against Samsung Electronics America alleging "direct and indirect patent infringement" of its augmented reality patents in Samsung’s Galaxy smart phones and tablets. Samsung motioned to dismiss GeoVector’s claims on the basis that the "statutes of limitations had run on these claims." The United States District Judge declared the matter vacated and Samsung's motion was immediately granted.
