= So Far Away =

So Far Away may refer to:

== Music ==
- So Far Away (album) or the title song, by the Chords, 1980

=== Songs ===
- "So Far Away" (Avenged Sevenfold song), 2011
- "So Far Away" (Carole King song), 1971
- "So Far Away" (Dire Straits song), 1985
- "So Far Away" (Martin Garrix and David Guetta song), 2017
- "So Far Away" (Stabbing Westward song), 2001
- "So Far Away" (Staind song), 2003
- "So Far Away", by Aiden from Conviction
- "So Far Away", by Alan Parsons from On Air
- "So Far Away", by Amici Forever from Defined
- "So Far Away", by the Apples in Stereo from Electronic Projects for Musicians
- "So Far Away", by Charli XCX from True Romance
- "So Far Away", by Crossfade from Crossfade
- "So Far Away", by David Gilmour from David Gilmour
- "So Far Away", by E-Type from Last Man Standing
- "So Far Away", by Goo Goo Dolls from Superstar Car Wash
- "So Far Away", by Mayday Parade from Anywhere but Here
- "So Far Away", by Nine Days from The Madding Crowd
- "So Far Away", by Red from Release the Panic
- "So Far Away", by Ronan Keating from Bring You Home
- "So Far Away", by Roxette from Pearls of Passion
- "So Far Away", by Social Distortion from Social Distortion

== See also ==
- "I Ran (So Far Away)", by A Flock of Seagulls, 1982
- Far Away (disambiguation)
- Far Far Away (disambiguation)
- Not So Far Away, by Wideawake, 2005
