= Incredible Universe =

American consumer electronics retail chain

- Type: Consumer electronics, home appliances, personal computers and accessories
- Founded: 1992
- Defunct: March 31, 1997
- Fate: 6 stores sold to Fry's Electronics, and one more acquired later from a third party owner Wal-Mart Stores or Target Corporation
- Headquarters: Arlington, Texas
- Parent: Tandy Corporation

Incredible Universe was a chain of American consumer electronics stores from 1992 to 1997. A typical Incredible Universe store was 185,000 square feet (17,200 m^{2}) of sales floor and warehouse, stocking around 85,000 items.

The operation was conceived by former Tandy CEO John V. Roach. Many internal corporate philosophies of Disney theme parks were borrowed; in an Incredible Universe store, retail departments were "scenes", employees were "cast members", customers were "guests", uniforms were "costumes", and so forth. The company was a joint venture between Tandy Corporation and Trans World Entertainment.

== Layout ==
By 1990, growth of Tandy Corporation's Radio Shack chain of electronics stores and Tandy personal computers had stalled. Incredible Universe was created with the intention of competing with rapidly growing electronics superstores like Circuit City, Best Buy, and CompUSA that were taking market share from Radio Shack. The company hoped that customers would drive up to 40 miles to a store, allowing one location to serve an area with as few as one million people, with two or three locations for large cities. The company calculated that annual sales of $45 million would allow each store to break even, and with sales of $65 million they could be as profitable as rivals, if not more so. Sell-side analysts estimated that 60 Incredible Universe stores could generate $4 billion in annual revenue, far more than Radio Shack's $2.8 billion in fiscal year 1992.

Unlike Radio Shack — relatively small, with high profit margins but slow inventory turnover — Incredible Universe stores emphasized low prices, low margins, and high volume. They featured a large rotunda area with a stage where sales presentations, product demonstrations, autograph signings, and even occasional musical acts were performed. Various retail departments (software, music and video, and accessories) were accessible from this rotunda; moving through the rotunda area would lead a customer to the main storefront where larger consumer electronics and computers were sold.

A store would also generally contain four to eight "sound rooms" where particular combinations of audio/video equipment could be demonstrated. Some stores contained McDonald's restaurants (the Wilsonville, Oregon store contained a Pizza Hut) and temporary day care facilities where parents could leave their small children while they shopped. Initially believed as a means to generate more business, inclusion of restaurants in the general shopping area had the unforeseen side effect of lowered revenue due to poor loss prevention strategies; improved loss prevention strategies practiced by Walmart and Best Buy can be noticed due to where they have placed the restaurants contained within their stores.

Many stores also had a second floor, which housed a cafeteria for the staff as well as training and demo rooms. The training rooms were used for demonstrating new products from vendors to the staff, as well as public training on computers, software, and audio/video gear that was for purchase. Rounding out the computer department was a computer upgrade center which could add new memory, a sound card, or a modem to a computer in just a few minutes.

== History ==
Initially, two Incredible Universe stores were opened in Arlington, Texas, and Wilsonville, Oregon. The stores pulled in large crowds, and once they proved profitable, Tandy decided to expand quickly, opening an additional 15 stores through 1996. In the mid-1990s, Incredible Universe was a sponsor of the Dallas Mavericks, Dallas Sidekicks, Dallas Stars, Sacramento Kings, and Texas Rangers professional sports franchises. During this time, however, with the growth of other retail outlets such as Best Buy, the market became more competitive, and the expense of operating such large facilities resulted in an overall lack of profitability for the entire enterprise.

Ultimately, the company was forced to close or sell all 17 of its locations between 1996 and 1997. Only six were ever consistently profitable; these six stores (Arlington, Dallas, Tempe, Wilsonville, Sacramento, San Diego) were sold to California company Fry's Electronics in 1996, which itself ceased operations in 2021.

The closed buildings were so large that they could not be readily adapted to other business purposes, and buyers were so scarce that Tandy sold the empty buildings for mere pennies on the dollar. In 1996, the Incredible Universe stores lost $90 million, and on December 30, 1996, Tandy announced the store closures. Tandy officials stated, "some [of the] stores were profitable, but overall the stores weren't viable." One of the former Incredible Universe sites, located in Houston, was acquired and redeveloped by Houston Community College, eventually becoming the school's West Loop campus. Another, in Woodbridge, Virginia, became a manufacturing plant for General Dynamics' line of amphibious war fighting vehicles from 2002 to 2012. It was later adapted to Gander Mtn. and Floor & Decor stores. The Gander Mountain location closed in 2017 and was replaced with a community crisis center in 2025. The Westbury, Long Island store was converted into a Target and no longer has the 'signature' look (bowed front) of an Incredible Universe. The Sandy, Utah store was converted to a Costco warehouse. The Auburn, Washington location, situated on the north side of the Supermall of the Great Northwest, was converted to a Sam's Club in 1999, retaining the original Incredible Universe façade; the location closed without warning in early 2018. Today, the site is a Fieldhouse USA, a multi-purpose sports facility. The Lone Tree, Colorado store became a Great Indoors until that chain closed in 2012, at which point it converted to a Sears Outlet; that eventually closed as well, and the location is now an At Home store. The Hollywood, Florida location remained empty for some time, but was eventually converted to a Home Depot which it remains to this day. The Columbus, Ohio location was converted into a Garden Ridge (now At Home), while the northern half of the parking lot was used to build a Dave & Buster's. The Pineville, NC store closed abruptly in 1997 after being open for only six months. It was converted to a Sam's Club location, but the front entrance area retained the original two-level overhang. The Fishers, Indiana store became a car dealership, but was taken over by Fry's from 2005 until 2021, and is currently vacant. The Doral, Florida location remained vacant until being gutted and converted into an AAAA Universe store in 2007, which later closed down. In 2017, the store was demolished and construction began on the Jose Milton Memorial Hospital at Jackson West, which opened in 2021. The Atlanta, Georgia location became a Dave & Buster's location in 1998; after its closure, the building housed a succession of other businesses, and is currently being rebuilt into an Amazon warehouse.
