= Grid Systems =

Early portable computer manufacturer

Grid Systems Corporation

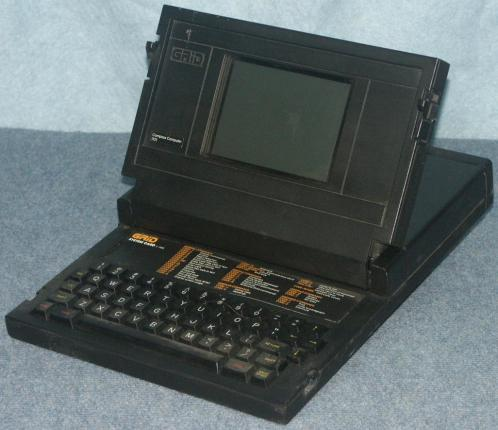
- The Grid Compass, one of the first laptops ever made
- Industry: Computers
- Founded: 1979; 47 years ago
- Founder: John Ellenby
- Defunct: 1988 (US division); 1993 (UK division)
- Fate: Purchased by Tandy Corporation (US division) Reformed to GRiD Defence Systems Ltd. (UK division)
- Headquarters: Fremont, California, United States

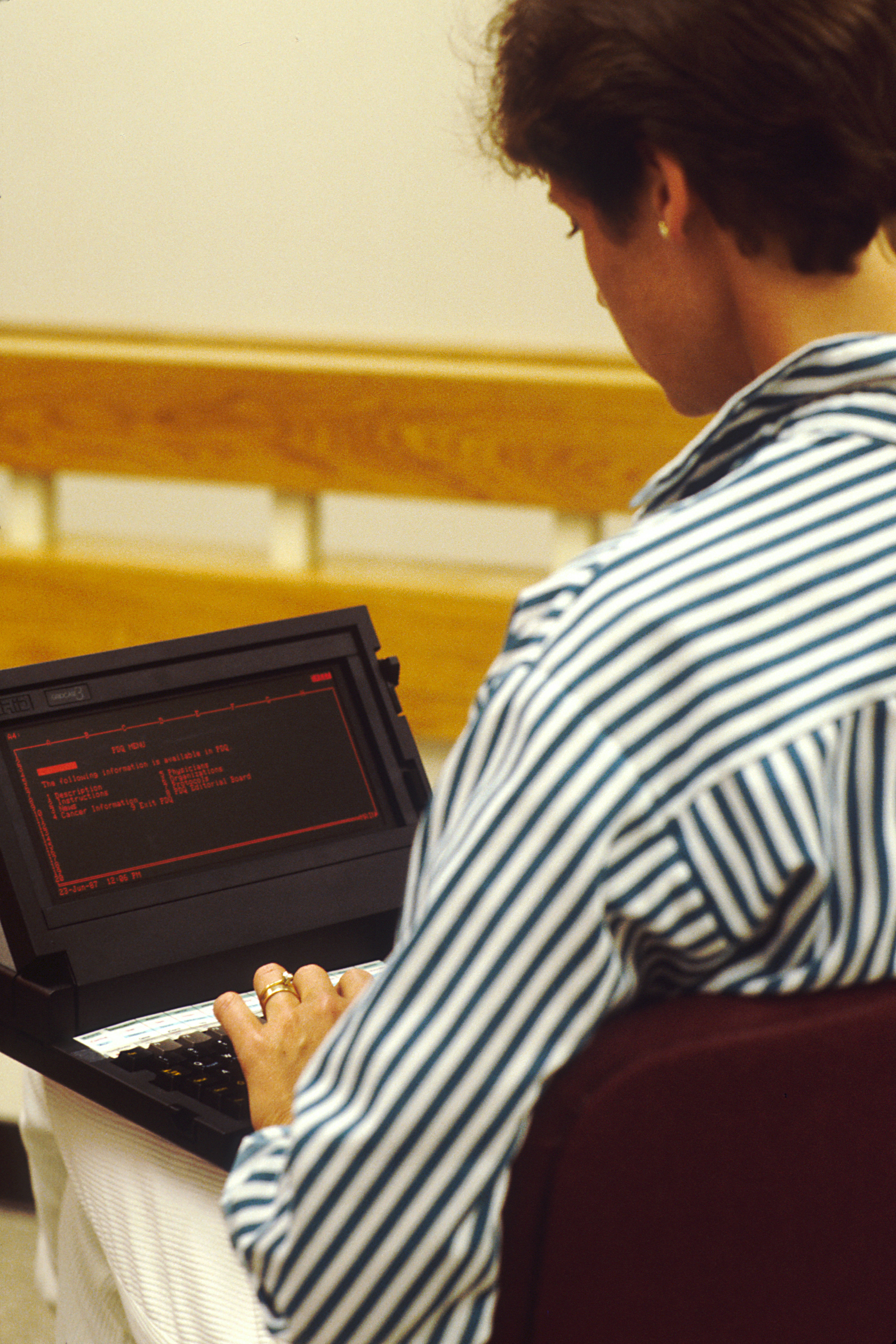
A woman using a GridCase 3 to access the PDQ cancer database in 1987

Grid Systems Corporation (stylized as GRiD) was an early portable computer manufacturer, based in the United States and oriented for the production of rugged and semi-rugged machines. Currently, the Grid computer brand still exists as Grid Defence Systems Ltd. in the United Kingdom.

== History ==
=== Early history ===
Grid Systems Corporation was founded in late 1979 by John Ellenby, who left his job at Xerox PARC and joined Glenn Edens, Dave Paulsen and Bill Moggridge to form one of Silicon Valley's first stealth companies. The company went public in March 1981. It was located at 47211 Lakeview Boulevard, Fremont, California, 94537.

The "GRiD" name with the unusual lowercase "i" in the middle was the result of discussion between John Ellenby, Glenn Edens and John Ellenby's wife, Gillian Ellenby, who pushed for the final choice. The lowercase "i" was a note of thanks to Intel for helping in the early days.

=== Sale of company and US division ===
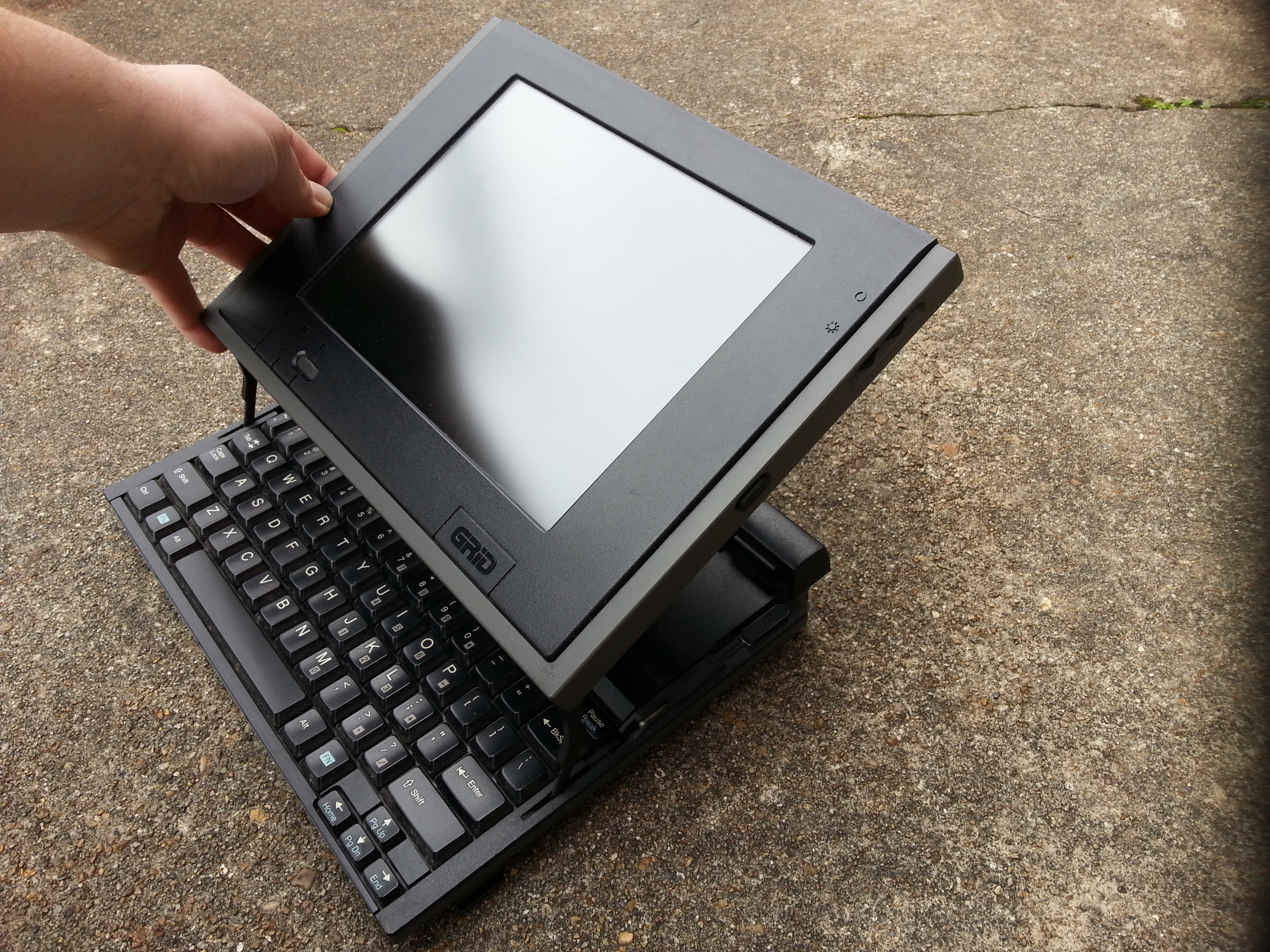
GridPad (1989)

In 1988, Tandy Corporation purchased the Grid company. AST Computer acquired the US wing of company, and was itself later acquired by Samsung.

Grid still produced the GRiDCASE laptops, and the first GridPad tablet also was released in 1989; Also a few rebranded models of another manufacturers were released, include Tandy/Victor Technologies Grid 386 (Compaq SLT clone), GRiDPad SL 2050 (Samsung PenMaster clone) and AST GRiDPad 2390 (Casio Zoomer/ Tandy Z-PDA clone).

Edens co-founded Waveform Corp and in 2003 joined the board of F5, and John Ellenby went on to co-found the companies Agilis and augmented reality pioneer GeoVector.

=== GRiD Defence Systems ===
Grid Defence Systems formed in London, England by former employees during a management buyout of the former GRiD Computer Systems UK Ltd. in 1993.

The UK Grid company starts with a simply "GRiD 1###"-branded rugged laptop line, and in 1995 reintroduced the GRiDCASE line.

== Innovations ==
Grid developed and released several pioneering ideas:

- The Grid Compass 1100, the first clamshell laptop computer
- Patented the "clamshell" laptop design
- First portable to use non-volatile bubble-memory
- Grid-OS was a multi-tasking Text-based user interface (or TUI) and operating system
- First use of electro-luminescent displays in a portable
- First use of magnesium for the case
- First use of the Intel 8086 and 8087 floating-point co-processor in a commercial product
- Pioneered the concept of a "bus" for connecting peripherals (using GPIB)
- First computer that included a fully functional telephone and telephone handset
- The first commercially successful tablet-type portable computer was the GridPad, released in September 1989. Its operating system was based on MS-DOS.
- A GRiD Compass 1101 was the first laptop in space. Required special modification to add a fan to pull air through the case. Subsequently, a GRiD 1530 flew on STS-29 in March 1989.

OldComputers.net called the 1982 GRiD Compass 1101 the "grand-daddy of all present-day laptop computers". It had 256k RAM, an 8086, 320x240 screen, and 384k of internal 'bubble memory' that held data with power off.

== Notable computers ==
- Grid Compass
- GridCase
- GridPad
