= Far Away =

Far Away may refer to:

== Music ==
=== Albums ===
- Far Away, a 2005 album by Lasgo, or its title song
- Far Away, a 1995 EP by Royal Hunt, or its title song

=== Songs ===
- "Far Away" (3+2 song), 2010
- "Far Away" (Ayumi Hamasaki song), 2000
- "Far Away" (Kindred the Family Soul song), 2003
- "Far Away" (Marsha Ambrosius song), 2010
- "Far Away" (Nickelback song), 2006
- "Far Away" (Tyga song), 2011
- "Far Away" (Wolfmother song), 2009
- "Be Quiet and Drive (Far Away)", by Deftones, 1998
- "Far Away", by 12 Stones from Potter's Field
- "Far Away", by the Alexandrov Ensemble, 1956
- "Far Away", by Beast Coast from Escape from New York
- "Far Away", by BoyWithUke from Serotonin Dreams (2022)
- "Far Away", by Brainstorm from Ambiguity
- "Far Away", by Breaking Benjamin from Aurora
- "Far Away", by Carly Rae Jepsen from The Loneliest Time
- "Far Away", by Chantal Kreviazuk from Colour Moving and Still
- "Far Away", by Dave Alvin from Romeo's Escape
- "Far Away", by Dave Edmunds from Riff Raff
- "Far Away", by Erik Vee (2008)
  - Cover by Basshunter from Calling Time
- "Far Away", by Freedom Call from Dimensions
- "Far Away", by Frozen Crown from Call of the North
- "Far Away", by Helloween from Rabbit Don't Come Easy
- "Far Away", by Ingrid Michaelson from Girls and Boys
- "Far Away", by Jay Chou from Still Fantasy
- "Far Away", by Jay Sean from All or Nothing
- "Far Away", by Joe Jackson from Fast Forward
- "Far Away", by John Frusciante from The Will to Death
- "Far Away", by José González from Red Dead Redemption Original Soundtrack
- "Far Away", by Lecrae
- "Far Away", by Lionel Bart from his musical Blitz! (1962)
- "Far Away", by Martha Wainwright from Martha Wainwright
- "Far Away", by Royce da 5'9" from Street Hop
- "Far Away", by Scorpions from Fly to the Rainbow
- "Far Away", by Supergrass from Supergrass
- "Far Away", by Waltari from Space Avenue

== Other media ==
- Far Away (play), a 2000 play by Caryl Churchill
- Far Away (film), a Hong Kong film of 1954

== See also ==
- "Far Away, Far Away", a song by Noriyuki Makihara, covered by Tomiko Van from Voice 2: Cover Lovers Rock
- Faraway (disambiguation)
- Far Far Away (disambiguation)
- So Far Away (disambiguation)
- Far and Away, a 1992 film starring Tom Cruise and Nicole Kidman
