= John V. Roach =

American businessman (1938–2022)

- Born: November 22, 1938
- Died: March 20, 2022 (aged 83)
- Education: Texas Christian University
- Occupation: Executive
- Employer(s): Tandy Corporation; RadioShack
- Known for: Personal computer

John V. Roach (November 22, 1938 – March 20, 2022) was an American executive. He was one of the early proponents of the personal computer, launching the Tandy TRS-80.

== Early life and education ==
John Vinson Roach II was born on November 22, 1938, in Stamford, Texas, and moved to Fort Worth at the age of four. His mother, Agnes Margaret Roach nee Handon, was a nurse and his father owned a grocery store in Fort Worth.

Roach graduated from Amon Carter Riverside High School in 1957 and then studied physics and mathematics at Texas Christian University and earned a bachelor’s degree in business administration in 1961. After working for two years at the Navy’s Pacific Missile Range Facility in Hawaii, he returned to the university and earned a master’s in business administration in 1965. He also started experimenting with mainframes in college.

== Career ==
In 1967, he joined the Tandy Corporation, a conglomerate that owned Radioshack, as a data processing manager. In the following years, he played a key role in the company’s decision to venture into the budding personal computer market.

In January 1977, he presented the original TRS-80 prototype to Tandy’s CEO Charles Tandy and Radioshack’s president Lewis Kornfeld. At just under $600, the TRS-80 quickly became the best-selling personal computer on the market. To write the software code for the TRS-80, Tandy hired eventual Microsoft co-founders Bill Gates and Paul Allen.

Roach became RadioShack’s executive vice president in 1978. Tandy's computer success helped Roach become CEO in 1981. In 1983 he was named chief executive and chairman of Tandy, two positions he held until 1999. After leaving Tandy, Roach briefly served as CEO of Justin Industries before retiring.

In the 1990s, Roach also served as chairman of Texas Christian University’s board of trustees. In this role, he helped to double the university’s endowment to more than $1 billion and built a technology center. In 2007, the John V. Roach Honors College was endowed in his honor at Texas Christian University.

== Personal life ==
Roach died on March 20, 2022 at age 83.
