= Tandy-12 =

Handheld electronic game

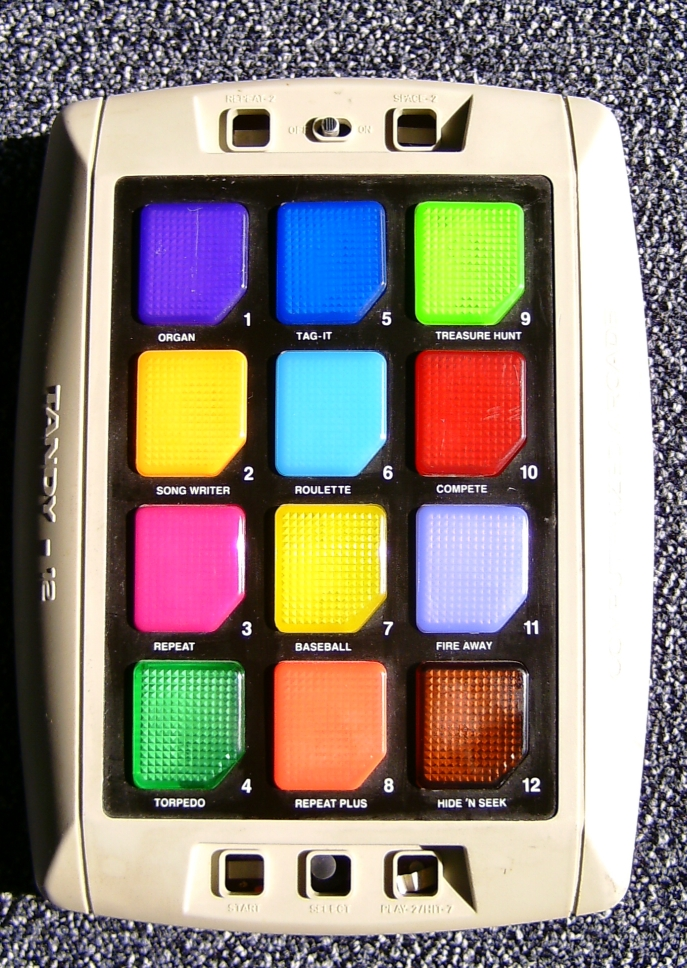
- Developer: Tandy
- Released: c. 1982

The Tandy-12 is a computerized arcade game produced by the Tandy Corporation for sale through its Radio Shack and Tandy electronics chain stores. The arcade game featured "12 challenging games of skill" as listed below. The game had its packaging updated several times since its original release. It was packaged with the game unit itself, a manual, a cardboard playing board, and a set of plastic tokens. Introduced in November 1981, it officially appeared in a 1982 catalog as the Tandy-12.

== Games ==
Games included in the Tandy-12 were:

- Organ – Electronic organ with 12 notes
- Song Writer – Record a song of up to 44 notes
- Repeat – Follow a random sequence like in Simon
- Torpedo – Fire torpedoes to sink enemy submarines
- Tag-It – Try to catch 110 moles
- Roulette – Electronic roulette (uses playing board)
- Baseball – Electronic baseball (Uses playing board)
- Repeat Plus – Repeat variant for two or more players
- Treasure Hunt – Variant of the board game Master Mind
- Complete – Battle of reaction time
- Fire Away – Destroy enemy invaders
- Hide 'N Seek – Guess the computer's three numbers in order
