= Faraway Farm =

Historic house in West Virginia, United States

- U.S. National Register of Historic Places
- Location within West Virginia Location within the United States
- Location: WV 8, near Martinsburg, West Virginia
- Coordinates: 39°32′55″N 77°56′23″W
- Area: 1 acre (0.40 ha)
- Built: c. 1865
- Architectural style: West Virginia Porch
- MPS: Berkeley County MRA
- NRHP reference No.: 80004432
- Added to NRHP: December 10, 1980

Faraway Farm, also known as the Daniel Ropp House, is a historic home located near Martinsburg, Berkeley County, West Virginia. It was built about 1865 and is a two-story, L-shaped brick dwelling. It is five bays wide and the ell is four bays long with a two-story recessed porch. The entrance features a one-bay, one-story pedimented portico with plain balusters and column shafts with chamfered edges, known as a "West Virginia Porch."

It was listed on the National Register of Historic Places in 1980.
