= Fairway, Lexington =

Fairway
- Neighborhood of Lexington, Kentucky
- Interactive map of Fairway
- Coordinates: 38.03°N 84.47°W
- Country: United States
- State: Kentucky
- County: Fayette
- City: Lexington

Area
  - Total: 0.182 sq mi (0.47 km^{2})
  - Water: 0 sq mi (0.0 km^{2})

Population (2000)
  - Total: 677
  - Density: 3,725/sq mi (1,438/km^{2})
- Time zone: UTC-5 (Eastern (EST))
  - Summer (DST): UTC-4 (EDT)
- ZIP code: 40502
- Area code: 859

Fairway is a neighborhood in southeast Lexington, Kentucky, United States. Its boundaries are Sherman Avenue to the north, railroad tracks to the north, Richmond Road to the west, and the Idle Hour Golf Course to the south.

== Neighborhood statistics ==
- Area: 0.182 square miles (0.47 km^{2})
- Population: 677
- Population density: 3,725 people per square mile
- Median household income: $67,093 (2010)
