= Fairway Markets =

Grocery chain on Vancouver Island in British Columbia, Canada

Fairway Markets logo

Fairway Markets is a regional grocery chain on Vancouver Island, British Columbia, Canada.

Stores are located in Brentwood Bay, Langford, Nanaimo, Oak Bay, Saanich (3), Sidney, and Victoria.

The nine-store chain was founded by Don Yuen in 1963 and employs over 700.

== Founder ==
Founder and President Don Yuen was born in China, where his family had operated a grocery store for three generations and came to Canada in 1949 after the family lost their business to communism. Yuen worked at his uncle's store and at a sawmill before embarking on his own store in 1963.
