= Away, Rajasthan =

Village in India

Away
- Village
- Away
- Location within Rajasthan Location within India
- Coordinates: 27°31′00″N 71°49′53″E
- Country: India
- State: Rajasthan
- District: Jaisalmer District

Area
  - Total: 114.81 km^{2} (44.33 sq mi)

Population
  - Total: 2,213

Away is a village located in Pokaran Tehsil of Jaisalmer district in Rajasthan, India. It is situated 90 km away from sub-district headquarter Pokaran and 200 km away from district headquarter Jaisalmer.

The total geographical area of village is 11481 hectares. Away had a total population of 2,213 people as of 2011. There are about 371 houses in the village. Pokaran is the nearest town, approximately 90 km away.
