= Fairway, Gauteng =

Fairway
- Location within Gauteng Location within South Africa
- Coordinates: 26.131°S 28.062°E
- Country: South Africa
- Province: Gauteng
- Municipality: City of Johannesburg
- Main Place: Johannesburg
- Established: 1955

Area
  - Total: 0.15 km^{2} (0.058 sq mi)

Population (2011)
  - Total: 667
  - Density: 4,400/km^{2} (12,000/sq mi)

Racial makeup (2011)
  - Black African: 33.5%
  - Coloured: 1.8%
  - Indian/Asian: 3.3%
  - White: 60.8%
  - Other: 0.6%

First languages (2011)
  - English: 58.3%
  - Afrikaans: 11.3%
  - Tswana: 7.7%
  - Zulu: 6.8%
  - Other: 15.9%
- Time zone: UTC+2 (SAST)

Fairway is a suburb of Johannesburg, South Africa. Situated in the northern suburbs, it is found adjacent to the Wanderers Club. It is located in Region E of the City of Johannesburg Metropolitan Municipality.

== History ==
Prior to the discovery of gold on the Witwatersrand in 1886, the suburb lay on land on one of the original farms called Syferfontein. It became a suburb on 29 June 1955 and the suburbs name originates after the nearby Wanderers Golf Club.
