= List of homesteads in Western Australia: D–F =

This list includes all homesteads in Western Australia with a gazetted name. It is complete with respect to the 1996 Gazetteer of Australia. Dubious names have been checked against the online 2004 data, and in all cases confirmed correct. However, if any homesteads have been gazetted or deleted since 1996, this list does not reflect these changes. Strictly speaking, Australian place names are gazetted in capital letters only; the names in this list have been converted to mixed case in accordance with normal capitalisation conventions.

| Name | Location | Remarks |
|---|---|---|
| Dairy Creek | 25°17′S 115°52′E | |
| Dairydale | 33°29′S 115°39′E | |
| Dajan | 33°44′S 122°28′E | |
| Dalangela Farm | 33°27′S 115°40′E | |
| Dalaroo | 30°35′S 116°1′E | |
| Dale Park | 32°13′S 116°44′E | |
| Dale Park | 32°28′S 116°48′E | |
| Dale Rose | 33°4′S 116°35′E | |
| Dalebanks | 33°23′S 117°3′E | |
| Dalgaranga | 27°46′S 117°1′E | |
| Dalgety Downs | 25°17′S 116°12′E | |
| Dalgooka | 29°18′S 115°49′E | |
| Dalguring | 30°37′S 115°44′E | |
| Daliak | 31°52′S 116°45′E | |
| Daliup | 33°36′S 116°51′E | |
| Dalkeith | 33°40′S 117°3′E | |
| Dalkon Downs | 33°14′S 118°47′E | |
| Dalmatia | 33°51′S 115°47′E | |
| Dalmeny | 32°13′S 117°55′E | |
| Dalmore | 32°37′S 118°11′E | |
| Dalwinne | 29°7′S 115°58′E | |
| Daly Outcamp | 28°15′S 119°47′E | |
| Dalyup Park | 33°47′S 121°33′E | |
| Dambagee | 30°45′S 115°46′E | |
| Dampier Downs | 18°31′S 123°27′E | |
| Dampier Downs Outcamp | 18°23′S 123°4′E | |
| Danby | 33°48′S 117°47′E | |
| Dandalgo | 33°37′S 115°59′E | |
| Dandallen Park | 30°37′S 115°29′E | |
| Dandalloo | 30°42′S 115°35′E | |
| Dandaraga | 28°8′S 119°18′E | |
| Danetree | 33°48′S 117°15′E | |
| Danjining | 30°55′S 118°15′E | |
| Danmor | 30°47′S 115°56′E | |
| Darda | 27°38′S 121°22′E | |
| Darena | 33°6′S 115°48′E | |
| Daringa | 33°43′S 115°21′E | |
| Dark Forrest | 31°7′S 116°44′E | |
| Darlington | 31°35′S 116°46′E | |
| Darlingup | 33°34′S 116°42′E | |
| Darlingup | 33°33′S 115°46′E | |
| Darradup | 34°5′S 115°36′E | |
| Darrallen Downs | 34°17′S 118°49′E | |
| Dartmoor | 27°59′S 115°13′E | |
| Datatine Gulls | 33°32′S 117°55′E | |
| Davilak | 33°29′S 115°39′E | |
| Davrod Estates | 33°39′S 119°41′E | |
| Dawlesford | 33°47′S 117°40′E | |
| Dawn Glen | 31°35′S 116°7′E | |
| De Grey | 20°11′S 119°11′E | |
| Deadfinish | 32°53′S 117°54′E | |
| Debesa | 17°48′S 124°5′E | |
| Deep Pool | 32°13′S 116°50′E | |
| Deep Well | 29°21′S 116°24′E | |
| Deepdale | 21°43′S 116°11′E | |
| Deepdale | 31°33′S 116°25′E | |
| Deepdene | 34°16′S 115°3′E | |
| Deepinghurst | 31°22′S 116°43′E | |
| Delamere | 32°20′S 116°44′E | |
| Deloraine | 32°19′S 117°27′E | |
| Deloraine | 32°30′S 117°40′E | |
| Delyanine | 33°30′S 117°8′E | |
| Denby Dale | 32°26′S 117°6′E | |
| Deneryl | 34°30′S 118°23′E | |
| Denham Hills | 31°21′S 116°7′E | |
| Denmore Stud | 34°40′S 117°33′E | |
| Denton Park | 33°54′S 117°51′E | |
| Depolders | 33°26′S 121°29′E | |
| Depot Springs | 27°56′S 120°5′E | |
| Devella Downs | 33°22′S 121°1′E | |
| Devils Creek | 28°39′S 115°27′E | |
| Devon Brook | 33°27′S 117°15′E | |
| Devon Lea | 33°40′S 117°38′E | |
| Devonports | 33°31′S 117°53′E | |
| Diamond Downs | 33°52′S 120°15′E | |
| Diamond Well | 26°11′S 119°32′E | |
| Diemal | 29°40′S 119°18′E | |
| Diggers Rest | 33°31′S 121°58′E | |
| Dilhorne | 31°33′S 116°36′E | |
| Dillon Bay | 34°27′S 119°16′E | |
| Dimmer Outcamp | 28°12′S 115°39′E | |
| Dingle Well | 29°13′S 116°11′E | |
| Dingley Dell | 32°19′S 117°8′E | |
| Dingo Dell | 33°9′S 117°59′E | |
| Dingville | 34°0′S 115°2′E | |
| Dingwall | 32°22′S 116°40′E | |
| Dinner Camp | 33°45′S 121°44′E | |
| Dirk Hartog | 26°0′S 113°12′E | |
| Dissalldoo | 32°42′S 117°29′E | |
| Dixons Hill | 33°8′S 117°45′E | |
| Dockers Hill | 34°31′S 117°38′E | |
| Dombitt Hills | 32°45′S 116°46′E | |
| Donelly | 34°13′S 119°4′E | |
| Dongallallup | 33°31′S 117°2′E | |
| Dongeena | 33°17′S 117°1′E | |
| Dongolocking | 33°8′S 117°46′E | |
| Donjill Downs | 33°49′S 118°13′E | |
| Donkey Springs | 29°40′S 115°26′E | |
| Donside | 33°9′S 118°2′E | |
| Dooen Langi | 34°0′S 117°16′E | |
| Doogalook | 28°50′S 114°58′E | |
| Dookaling | 30°29′S 116°26′E | |
| Dookanooka | 29°38′S 115°39′E | |
| Dookening | 33°5′S 116°46′E | |
| Dookie Downs | 34°50′S 117°51′E | |
| Dooledup | 33°55′S 117°19′E | |
| Dooley Downs | 24°8′S 117°7′E | |
| Doolgunna | 25°41′S 119°13′E | |
| Doon Doon | 16°19′S 128°15′E | |
| Doorawarrah | 24°48′S 114°26′E | |
| Dootamarra | 34°0′S 116°30′E | |
| Doreenup | 33°49′S 117°14′E | |
| Dorset Downs | 34°13′S 116°59′E | |
| Double Gee | 29°12′S 114°55′E | |
| Doungup Park | 33°30′S 115°32′E | |
| Dovedale | 30°59′S 115°43′E | |
| Dowlering | 33°32′S 117°8′E | |
| Doyston | 33°37′S 115°37′E | |
| Dreissen | 31°29′S 116°33′E | |
| Dromana | 33°26′S 115°45′E | |
| Drumalbyn | 31°17′S 115°46′E | |
| Drumclyer | 32°6′S 116°53′E | |
| Drysdale River | 15°43′S 126°23′E | |
| Dualling | 33°24′S 118°13′E | |
| Duart Downs | 34°12′S 116°46′E | |
| Ducedomen | 33°0′S 115°53′E | |
| Duchess Downs | 33°51′S 122°36′E | |
| Duck Creek | 22°31′S 116°35′E | |
| Dudinyillup | 33°54′S 115°50′E | |
| Dukanally | 33°1′S 115°55′E | |
| Duke Of Orleans | 33°50′S 122°34′E | |
| Dulverton | 34°30′S 117°53′E | |
| Dumar | 33°48′S 118°50′E | |
| Dumbarton | 31°34′S 116°31′E | |
| Dun-cullin | 30°56′S 115°57′E | |
| Duna | 32°31′S 118°2′E | |
| Dunbar | 33°48′S 115°15′E | |
| Dunbar | 33°37′S 117°36′E | |
| Dundillyn | 31°35′S 116°48′E | |
| Dundoon | 31°13′S 116°11′E | |
| Dunearn | 30°30′S 115°35′E | |
| Dunedin | 30°4′S 116°51′E | |
| Dunelm | 33°36′S 117°59′E | |
| Dunester | 29°38′S 115°54′E | |
| Dunhelm | 31°27′S 116°32′E | |
| Dunleath | 33°22′S 116°47′E | |
| Dunmore | 31°55′S 116°56′E | |
| Dunmore Park | 31°21′S 115°41′E | |
| Dunn Rock | 33°26′S 119°31′E | |
| Dunnart | 33°42′S 118°42′E | |
| Dunns | 33°49′S 122°18′E | |
| Dunric | 33°39′S 120°29′E | |
| Dunromin | 29°43′S 115°58′E | |
| Dunroven | 33°11′S 117°33′E | |
| Dunsinane | 33°55′S 117°41′E | |
| Dunterry | 31°29′S 116°1′E | |
| Dunvegan | 33°37′S 118°41′E | |
| Duordi Downs | 33°4′S 119°52′E | |
| Durack River | 15°33′S 127°39′E | |
| Dusty Outcamp | 18°45′S 125°51′E | |
| Dwarlacking | 32°24′S 117°27′E | |
| Dyliabing | 33°32′S 117°53′E | |
| Dymesbury Park | 34°56′S 117°54′E | |
| Eaglehawk Flats | 30°55′S 115°25′E | |
| Earaheedy | 25°36′S 121°35′E | |
| East Lynne | 34°0′S 117°5′E | |
| East Yangedine | 32°0′S 116°54′E | |
| Eastlynnel | 34°1′S 117°5′E | |
| Eastmore | 32°35′S 117°23′E | |
| Easton Neston | 33°9′S 118°28′E | |
| Eastville | 32°47′S 117°44′E | |
| Eatondale | 34°33′S 117°48′E | |
| Echo Downs | 34°24′S 117°10′E | |
| Edaggee | 25°22′S 114°15′E | |
| Edah | 28°17′S 117°9′E | |
| Eddington | 32°14′S 117°39′E | |
| Eddington | 33°59′S 117°22′E | |
| Eden Hope | 32°43′S 117°25′E | |
| Eden Park | 33°11′S 117°17′E | |
| Eden Vale | 30°55′S 115°29′E | |
| Eden Vale | 33°23′S 115°47′E | |
| Eden Valley | 35°2′S 117°35′E | |
| Eden Valley | 31°58′S 116°41′E | |
| Edenvale | 33°23′S 115°47′E | |
| Edenvale | 32°16′S 116°57′E | |
| Edfordale | 29°53′S 116°24′E | |
| Edgeworth | 33°9′S 117°3′E | |
| Edjudina | 29°49′S 122°21′E | |
| Edmund | 23°46′S 116°7′E | |
| Eeleeana | 34°6′S 117°34′E | |
| Eelya Park | 29°48′S 115°18′E | |
| Eerala | 21°23′S 117°6′E | |
| Effiedale | 34°39′S 117°23′E | |
| Eginbah | 20°52′S 119°47′E | |
| Egoline | 31°39′S 116°36′E | |
| Egypt Estate | 34°34′S 117°37′E | |
| Ekinooka | 28°53′S 114°58′E | |
| El Questro | 16°1′S 127°59′E | |
| El-dorado | 33°50′S 118°34′E | |
| Elands Fontein | 33°38′S 117°48′E | |
| Elanora | 33°39′S 121°50′E | |
| Elberton | 33°51′S 115°2′E | |
| Elderslie | 33°46′S 116°20′E | |
| Eldorado | 34°44′S 117°52′E | |
| Elerey | 33°30′S 115°34′E | |
| Elgee Cliffs Outcamp | 17°24′S 127°18′E | |
| Elgor | 34°7′S 118°46′E | |
| Elimatta | 33°45′S 120°49′E | |
| Elinda | 32°16′S 118°8′E | |
| Ellamatta | 33°32′S 116°43′E | |
| Ellavalla | 25°5′S 114°23′E | |
| Ellen Downs | 34°19′S 118°25′E | |
| Ellenbrae | 15°58′S 127°4′E | |
| Ellendale | 28°53′S 114°56′E | |
| Ellendale | 17°56′S 124°49′E | |
| Ellendale | 33°8′S 117°47′E | |
| Ellengail | 29°50′S 115°13′E | |
| Ellensbrook | 33°55′S 114°59′E | |
| Ellensfield | 33°59′S 117°31′E | |
| Ellerslie | 32°54′S 116°43′E | |
| Ellesford | 31°9′S 116°3′E | |
| Elliotts Place | 29°50′S 115°30′E | |
| Ellterra | 34°9′S 115°8′E | |
| Ellterra | 32°49′S 118°25′E | |
| Elmhurst | 33°50′S 115°6′E | |
| Elmsdale | 33°33′S 115°38′E | |
| Elora | 29°32′S 122°50′E | |
| Elroy | 33°42′S 122°14′E | |
| Elserae | 29°50′S 116°27′E | |
| Elstree Farm | 33°37′S 119°56′E | |
| Eltekon | 34°25′S 117°32′E | |
| Elvira Park | 33°16′S 115°47′E | |
| Elvire | 18°23′S 127°58′E | |
| Elwood Park | 34°4′S 115°7′E | |
| Elyaring | 31°14′S 116°40′E | |
| Em-a-lee Downs | 33°34′S 121°45′E | |
| Emanbee | 33°59′S 117°36′E | |
| Emoh Rou | 33°26′S 117°35′E | |
| Emoh Ruo | 33°37′S 115°38′E | |
| Emoh Ruo | 33°26′S 117°35′E | |
| Emu Downs | 33°54′S 116°14′E | |
| Emu Plain | 32°56′S 118°24′E | |
| Emu Plains | 34°28′S 117°20′E | |
| Emuloo | 32°20′S 118°24′E | |
| Endeavour | 33°21′S 120°11′E | |
| Eneabba Downs | 29°48′S 115°20′E | |
| Eneabba Springs | 29°47′S 115°25′E | |
| Enfield Park | 29°46′S 116°10′E | |
| Ennuin | 30°45′S 119°0′E | |
| Enterprise Farm | 33°18′S 116°2′E | |
| Epasco | 33°43′S 122°33′E | |
| Eraramba Farms | 29°28′S 115°26′E | |
| Erinair | 33°46′S 121°13′E | |
| Erindale | 32°47′S 117°51′E | |
| Erindoon | 29°54′S 115°11′E | |
| Eriswell Park | 33°59′S 116°49′E | |
| Eriwin Station | 33°52′S 118°22′E | |
| Erlistoun | 28°20′S 122°9′E | |
| Erodosi | 33°53′S 117°44′E | |
| Erong | 25°34′S 116°40′E | |
| Erong Springs | 25°34′S 116°40′E | |
| Errabiddy | 25°28′S 117°8′E | |
| Erregulla Farms | 29°12′S 115°30′E | |
| Erregulla Plains | 29°14′S 115°24′E | |
| Eschol Springs | 31°21′S 115°43′E | |
| Esperance Downs Research Station | 33°36′S 121°47′E | |
| Esperancho | 33°40′S 121°54′E | |
| Estuary Park | 32°43′S 115°44′E | |
| Etakup | 33°51′S 117°34′E | |
| Ethel Creek | 22°54′S 120°10′E | |
| Etna | 33°56′S 117°27′E | |
| Ettrick | 20°32′S 119°40′E | |
| Euaralla | 32°41′S 116°54′E | |
| Eudamullah | 24°27′S 115°36′E | |
| Eugenup | 33°55′S 117°59′E | |
| Eulanda | 33°50′S 117°23′E | |
| Eulo | 33°52′S 117°12′E | |
| Eurabin | 34°3′S 118°17′E | |
| Eurardy | 27°34′S 114°40′E | |
| Eureka | 33°58′S 117°41′E | |
| Eureka | 28°39′S 115°29′E | |
| Eureka | 28°43′S 115°3′E | |
| Euretta | 33°57′S 117°11′E | |
| Euroa | 31°43′S 118°26′E | |
| Eurokaba | 33°15′S 115°47′E | |
| Euvista | 33°53′S 117°20′E | |
| Evanlea | 33°44′S 116°25′E | |
| Evelyn Farm | 32°59′S 118°28′E | |
| Exmouth Gulf | 22°23′S 114°6′E | |
| Fair Valley | 33°43′S 116°42′E | |
| Fair Wind | 33°44′S 116°35′E | |
| Fairdale | 33°45′S 117°9′E | |
| Fairfield | 28°58′S 114°48′E | |
| Fairfield | 29°28′S 115°51′E | |
| Fairfield | 33°50′S 117°31′E | |
| Fairfield | 17°34′S 125°4′E | |
| Fairfield | 33°55′S 115°9′E | |
| Fairfield | 33°46′S 121°17′E | |
| Fairfield | 32°21′S 117°56′E | |
| Fairfield | 34°19′S 118°56′E | |
| Fairfield | 34°28′S 117°1′E | |
| Fairfield Park | 30°29′S 116°10′E | |
| Fairfields | 33°43′S 117°4′E | |
| Fairhaven | 32°27′S 117°23′E | |
| Fairlands | 33°33′S 117°21′E | |
| Fairlawn | 33°40′S 115°21′E | |
| Fairmoor | 33°6′S 121°35′E | |
| Fairview | 33°51′S 118°7′E | |
| Fairview | 32°14′S 116°59′E | |
| Fairview | 34°56′S 117°2′E | |
| Fairview | 33°36′S 117°30′E | |
| Fairview | 33°51′S 117°25′E | |
| Fairview | 31°48′S 116°51′E | |
| Fairview | 33°21′S 115°45′E | |
| Fairview | 33°51′S 115°12′E | |
| Falcondale | 33°18′S 118°18′E | |
| Falconhurst | 32°4′S 116°36′E | |
| Falkirk | 33°41′S 117°35′E | |
| Fallencleugh | 33°58′S 116°19′E | |
| Falnash | 33°55′S 116°18′E | |
| Far-n-nuf | 32°52′S 118°4′E | |
| Faraway | 33°53′S 120°29′E | |
| Faraway | 33°5′S 119°57′E | |
| Faraway Farms | 33°41′S 119°23′E | |
| Fatima Fields | 33°15′S 118°39′E | |
| Faure | 25°54′S 113°54′E | |
| Fawcett | 33°4′S 116°56′E | |
| Fawna Depot | 33°42′S 115°35′E | |
| Feltham Park | 32°37′S 118°8′E | |
| Fendale | 33°1′S 118°32′E | |
| Fennerberry | 32°12′S 117°53′E | |
| Ferguson | 33°26′S 115°50′E | |
| Fermoy | 33°55′S 117°42′E | |
| Fern Bach | 33°34′S 115°53′E | |
| Fern Grove | 31°33′S 116°23′E | |
| Fern Gully | 33°32′S 115°51′E | |
| Fern Hill | 32°37′S 116°36′E | |
| Fern Hill | 33°32′S 117°25′E | |
| Fern Lake | 34°33′S 117°24′E | |
| Fern Ridge | 34°54′S 117°42′E | |
| Fern Valley | 33°31′S 115°58′E | |
| Ferndale | 33°34′S 115°53′E | |
| Ferndale | 33°28′S 115°52′E | |
| Ferndale | 29°45′S 116°18′E | |
| Ferndale | 32°59′S 115°55′E | |
| Ferndale | 32°5′S 117°2′E | |
| Ferndale | 33°38′S 117°3′E | |
| Ferngully | 33°31′S 115°58′E | |
| Fernhill | 32°24′S 117°16′E | |
| Fernielee | 33°56′S 117°12′E | |
| Fernlea | 31°19′S 116°31′E | |
| Fernleigh | 31°54′S 116°44′E | |
| Fernridge | 33°26′S 117°37′E | |
| Fernside | 29°49′S 116°13′E | |
| Fernwood | 31°1′S 115°36′E | |
| Fielder Downs | 33°45′S 120°37′E | |
| Fifield | 33°49′S 117°48′E | |
| Fineview | 33°41′S 117°57′E | |
| Fir Park | 33°19′S 115°45′E | |
| Firnsdale | 33°23′S 115°44′E | |
| Fitzroy | 29°22′S 116°17′E | |
| Flat Rocks | 33°57′S 117°24′E | |
| Flemington | 33°20′S 117°32′E | |
| Flora Valley | 18°18′S 128°26′E | |
| Floradale | 34°58′S 117°38′E | |
| Floradale | 33°54′S 117°54′E | |
| Floral Park | 32°52′S 116°31′E | |
| Fly Flat Outstation | 18°5′S 122°28′E | |
| Follans | 32°41′S 116°46′E | |
| Follys End | 33°52′S 116°56′E | |
| Fonyanna Outcamp | 20°36′S 118°14′E | |
| Footrot Flats | 29°11′S 114°55′E | |
| Footrot Flats | 33°52′S 115°59′E | |
| Forbes Outcamp | 25°27′S 121°2′E | |
| Forest Lodge | 33°3′S 117°5′E | |
| Forest Lodge | 31°23′S 116°38′E | |
| Forest View | 32°58′S 116°49′E | |
| Forrard Away | 34°0′S 116°26′E | |
| Forres Farm | 33°19′S 116°5′E | |
| Forrest Downs | 31°23′S 116°37′E | |
| Forrest Glen | 33°14′S 115°55′E | |
| Forrest Grove | 33°7′S 117°27′E | |
| Forrest Hill | 31°30′S 116°45′E | |
| Forrest Hills | 33°32′S 115°55′E | |
| Forrestdale | 32°12′S 116°46′E | |
| Fort Valley | 33°56′S 117°18′E | |
| Fossil Downs | 18°8′S 125°46′E | |
| Foster Outcamp | 26°26′S 113°27′E | |
| Four J's Farm | 29°1′S 114°55′E | |
| Four Winds | 33°42′S 115°28′E | |
| Four Winds | 33°31′S 117°36′E | |
| Four Winds | 34°58′S 117°29′E | |
| Fourwinds | 32°43′S 117°41′E | |
| Fox River | 18°26′S 127°59′E | |
| Franklands | 34°20′S 117°0′E | |
| Fransell Park | 34°21′S 117°12′E | |
| Fraser Range | 32°2′S 122°48′E | |
| Frazier Downs | 18°48′S 121°43′E | |
| Frednavale | 33°30′S 122°1′E | |
| Frewin | 33°18′S 118°19′E | |
| Fullwood | 33°33′S 115°59′E | |
| Fuss | 33°50′S 120°51′E | |
