= Grid Compass =

Early laptop computer

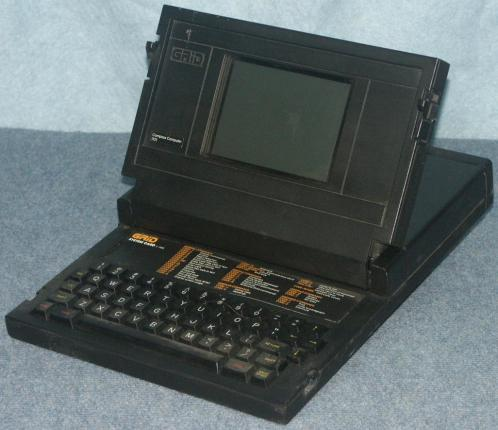
- Grid Compass 1101, from 1982
- Developer: Bill Moggridge
- Manufacturer: GRiD Systems Corp.
- Type: Laptop computer
- Released: April 1982
- Introductory price: US$8,150 (equivalent to $26,550 in 2024)
- Operating system: CCOS (Compass Computer Operating System), optionally MS-DOS 2
- CPU: Intel 8086
- Memory: 256 KB
- Storage: 384 KB magnetic bubble
- Display: 320 × 240
- Connectivity: 19-pin "serial", Telephone line+Audio 1,200 bit/s modem, GPIB
- Successor: GridCase 2

The Grid Compass is a family of laptop computers introduced in 1982 by the Grid Systems Corporation. The design for the Compass was rendered by Bill Moggridge. Owing to its clamshell design—the first in a portable computer—some historians credit the original Compass as the first ever laptop.

This original model of Compass lacked an internal battery compartment, requiring AC power from the wall. Grid sold the succeeding model, the Compass II, in 1984 with an optional external battery unit. Grid replaced the Compass with the GridCase line in 1985.

== History ==
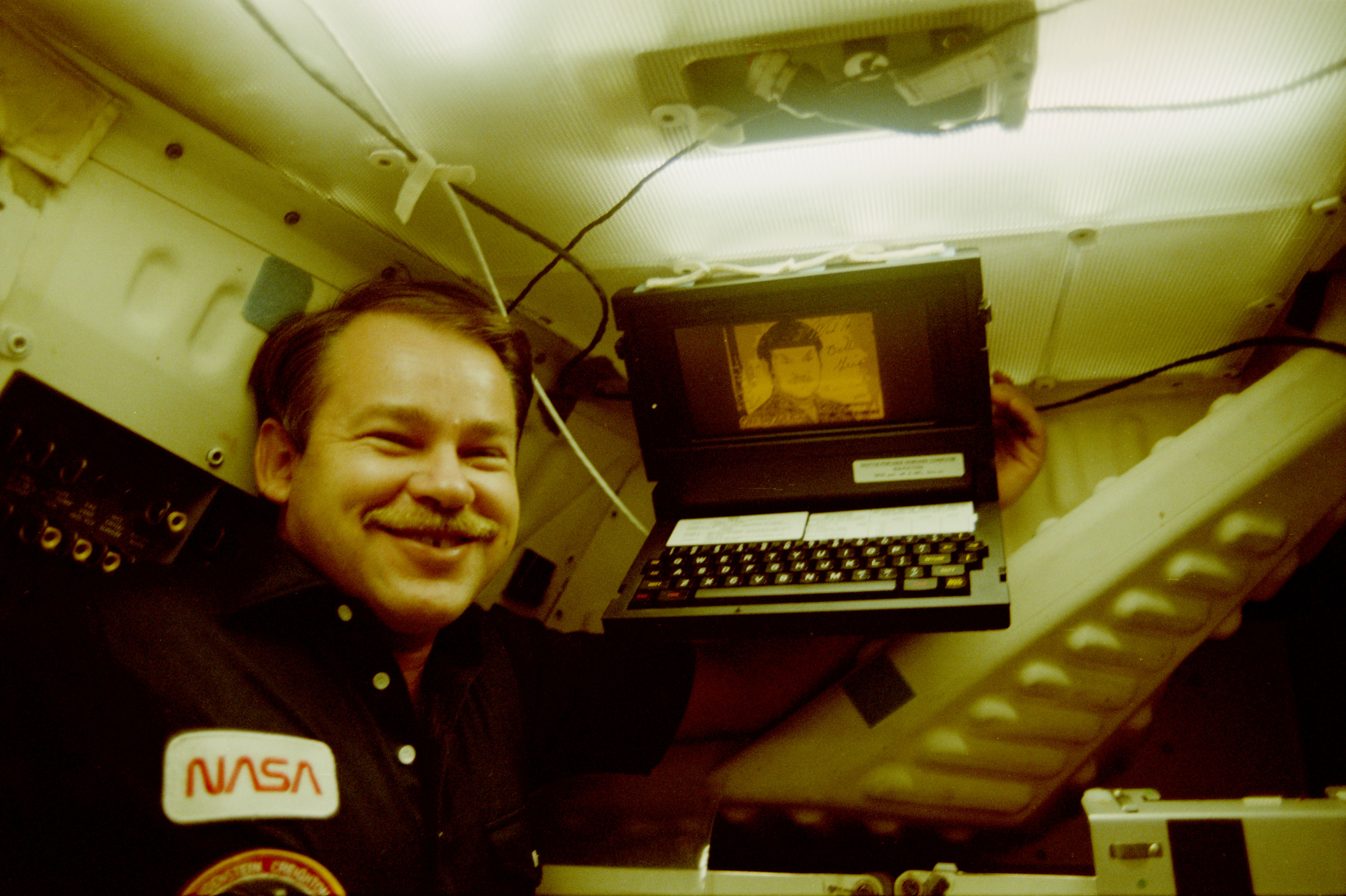
Astronaut John Creighton posing with a Grid Compass aboard a Space Shuttle Discovery mission in 1985

Development of the Compass began in 1979, and the main buyer was the U.S. government. NASA used it on the Space Shuttle during the early 1980s, as it was powerful, lightweight, and compact. The military Special Forces also purchased the machine, as it could be used by paratroopers in combat. The National Security Agency was reportedly interested in a TEMPEST-compliant version produced by SAIC.

Along with the Gavilan SC and Sharp PC-5000 released the following year, the GRiD Compass established much of the basic design of subsequent laptop computers, although the laptop concept itself owed much to the Dynabook project developed at Xerox PARC from the late 1960s. GRiD Systems Corporation subsequently earned significant returns on its patent rights as its innovations became commonplace.

=== Competitors ===
The portable Osborne 1 computer sold at around the same time as the GRiD, was more affordable and more popular, and ran the popular CP/M operating system. But, unlike the Compass, the Osborne was not a laptop and lacked the Compass's refinement and small size.

== Models ==
The Compass runs its own operating system, GRiD-OS. Its specialized software and high price (US$100,000–$1,000,000) meant that it was limited to specialized applications.

Grid at first intended customers to purchase an IBM minicomputer as the "Grid Central" remote host, from which Grid Compass would download software. Customers were uninterested, and Grid replaced it with "Grid Server", hosting a local-area network of up to 48 Compasses and IBM PCs, and 10 remote systems. The Server would run both Grid and MS-DOS software, the company's first acknowledgement of PC compatibility.

=== Compass ===
The initial model, the 1101, was introduced in April 1982; The 1100 model designation were never released commercially, but featured in some pre-release marketing material. The computer was designed by British industrial designer Bill Moggridge.

==== Design ====
The clamshell case (where the screen folds flat to the rest of the computer when closed) was made from a magnesium alloy. The computer features an Intel 8086 processor, a 320 × 240-pixel electroluminescent display, 384-kilobyte magnetic bubble memory, and a 1200 bit/s modem. Devices such as hard drives and floppy drives can be connected via the IEEE-488 I/O (also known as GPIB or General Purpose Interface Bus). This port makes it possible to connect multiple devices to the addressable device bus. It weighs 5 kg (11 lb). The power input is ~110/220 V AC, 47–66 Hz, 75 W.

=== Compass II ===
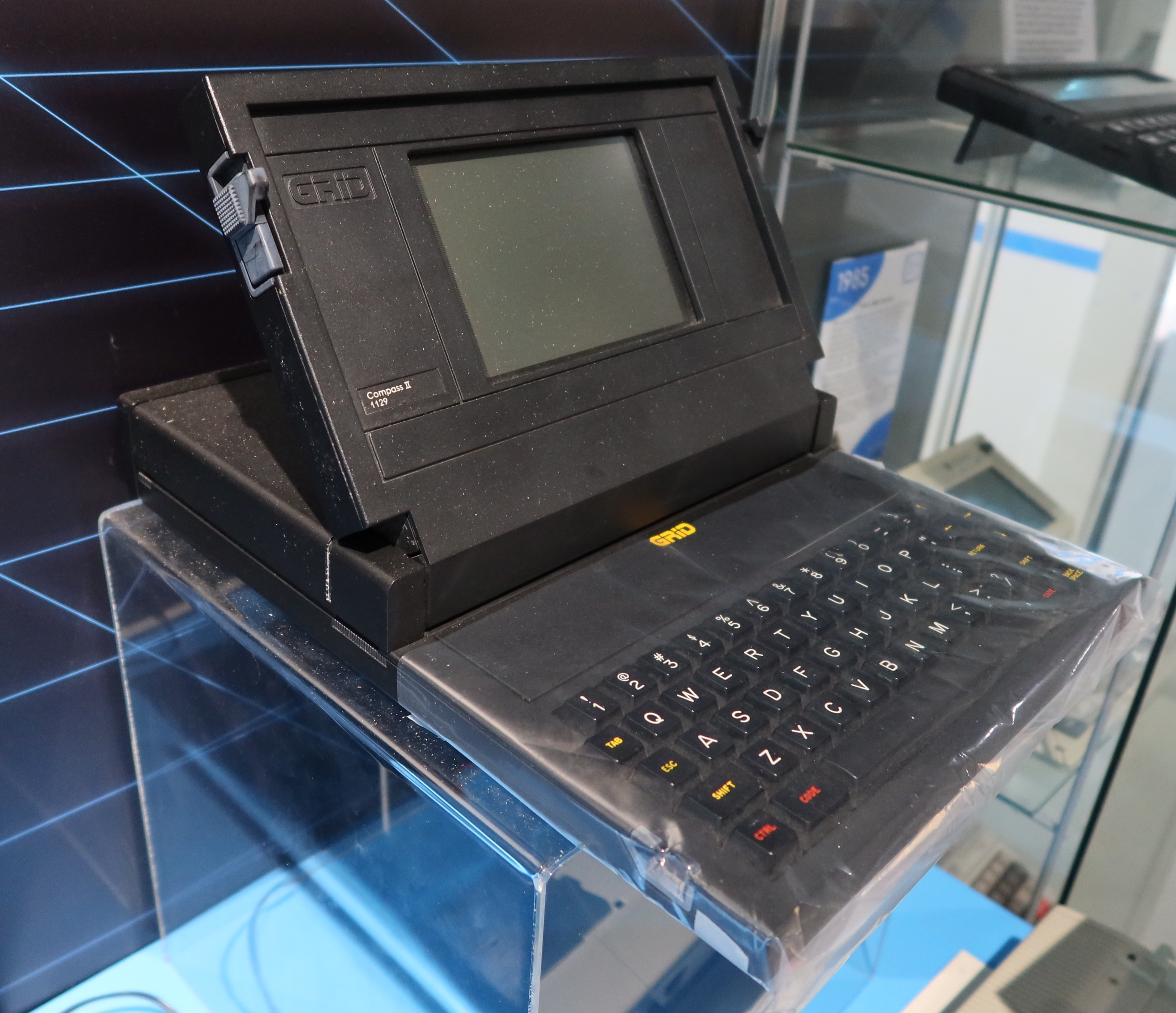
GRiD Compass II 1129

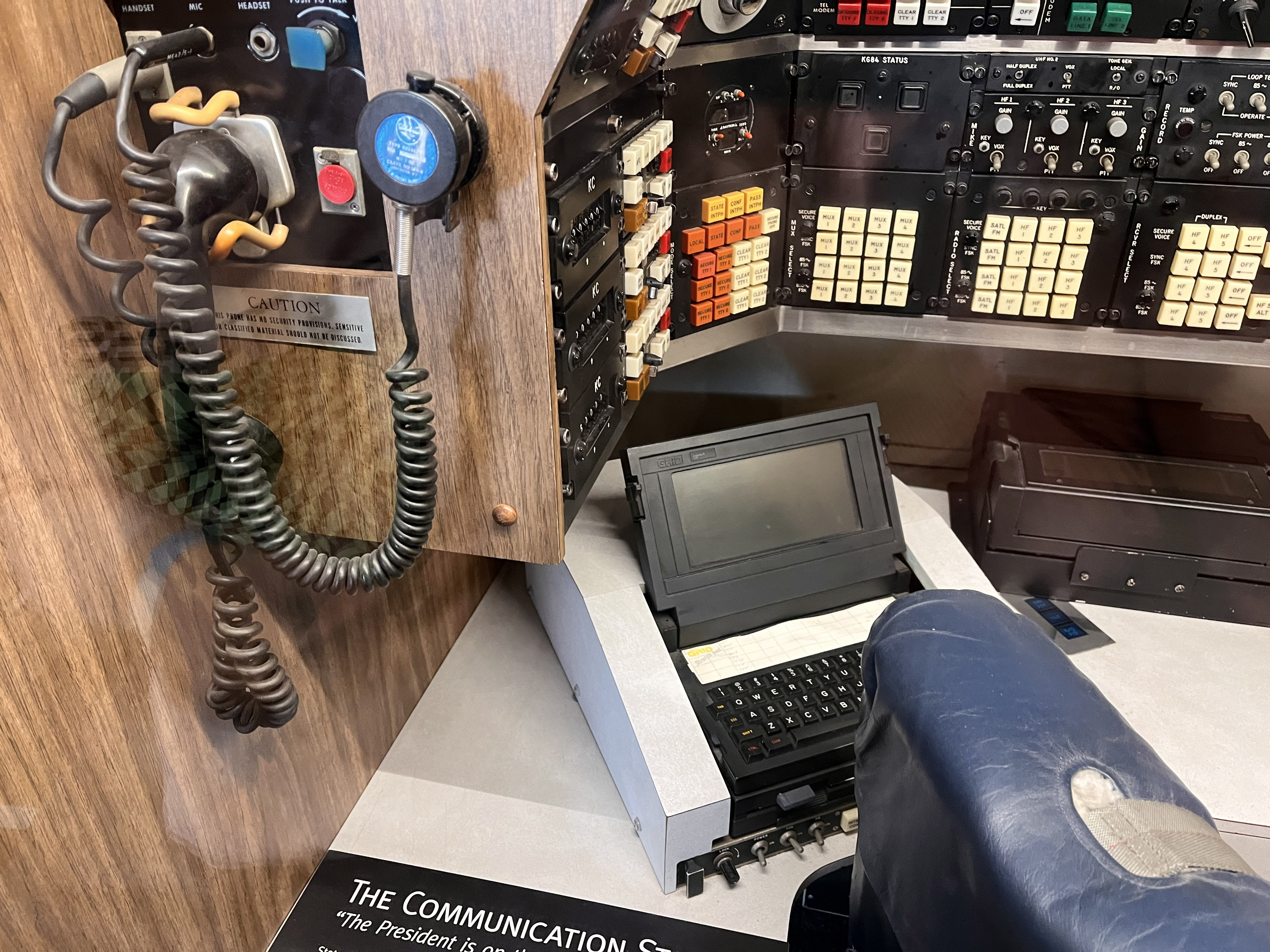
GRiD Compass II onboard the VC-137

The Compass II was released in 1984; known as 1121, 1129, 1131 and 1139 models. The Compass II was a durable computer.
