= Tandy Corporation =

Retail company based in Fort Worth, Texas, United States (1919–2000)

- Formerly: Hinckley-Tandy Leather Company (1919–1956); General American Industries (1956–1961)
- Industry: Retail
- Founded: 1919; 107 years ago (as Hinckley-Tandy Leather Company); Fort Worth, Texas, U.S.
- Founders: Norton Hinckley; Dave L. Tandy
- Defunct: May 2000; 26 years ago
- Fate: Renamed to RadioShack
- Successor: RadioShack; Tandy Leather Factory
- Products: Leather goods Electronics
- Website: tandy.com at the Wayback Machine (archived 2000-03-01)

Tandy Corporation was an American family-owned retailer based in Fort Worth, Texas that made leather goods, operated the RadioShack and Tandy electronics stores, and later built personal computers.

Tandy Leather was founded in 1919 as a leather supply store. By the end of the 1950s, under the tutelage of then-CEO Charles Tandy, the company expanded into the hobby market, making leather moccasins and coin purses, making huge sales among Scouts, leading to a fast growth in sales. Aiming to broaden the company horizon, Charles Tandy acquired a number of craft retail companies, including RadioShack in 1963, then an almost bankrupt chain of electronics stores in Boston.

In the 1970s and 1980s, now led by John Roach as CEO, the corporation started to invest into the personal computer market following the introduction of the popular TRS-80; it was one of the pioneers in the rising personal computer industry, being lauded by the magazine Financial World as "the driving force at the front-running company in the red-hot personal computer race". Unable to keep up with cost-cutting competitors, Tandy exited the PC business in 1993, selling its assets to AST Research, retaining its profitable goods-making units. In 2000, the Tandy Corporation name was dropped, and the entity became the RadioShack Corporation.

== History ==
Tandy began in 1919 when two friends, Norton Hinckley and Dave L. Tandy, decided to start the Hinckley-Tandy Leather Company and concentrated its efforts on selling sole leather and other supplies to shoe repair dealers in Texas. Hinckley and Tandy opened their first branch store in 1927 in Beaumont, Texas and in 1932, Dave Tandy moved the store from Beaumont to Houston, Texas. Tandy's business survived the economic storms of the Depression, gathered strength and developed a firm presence in the shoe findings (i.e. shoemakers' tools and supplies) business.

Dave Tandy had a son, Charles David Tandy, who was drafted into the business during his early twenties. Charles obtained a B.A. degree at Texas Christian University, then began attending the Harvard Business School to further expand his education. As World War II escalated Charles was called to serve his country in the military and relocated to Hawaii. He wrote to his father from overseas suggesting that leathercraft might offer new possibilities for growing the shoe finding business since the same supplies were used widely in Navy and Army hospitals and recreation centers. Leathercraft gave the men something useful to do and their handiwork, in addition to being therapeutic, had genuine value.

Charles Tandy returned home from the service as a lieutenant commander in 1948 and negotiated to operate the fledgling leathercraft division himself. He had encouraged and followed the development of that venture through correspondence with his father. Within a short time Charles succeeded in opening the first of two retail stores in 1950 that specialized exclusively in leathercraft. Hinckley did not share the enthusiasm of Dave and Charles Tandy for the new leathercraft division. As a result, the two original founders came to an agreement in 1950 that Hinckley would continue to pursue the shoe findings business and the Tandy partners would specialize in promoting leathercrafts.

The first Tandy Catalog, only eight pages long, was mailed to readers of Popular Science magazine who had responded to two-inch test ads that were placed by Tandy. From 1950 forward Tandy operated retail mail order stores supported by direct mail advertising. This successful formula helped the company expand into a chain of some 150 leathercraft stores. A growing do-it-yourself movement, prompted by a shortage of consumer goods and high labor costs, continued to gather momentum. The fifteen leathercraft stores opened during this division's first two years of operation became quite successful. Tandy began expanding by gaining new product lines; the first acquisition was with the American Handicrafts Company which featured a broad line of do-it-yourself handicraft products, two established retail stores in the New York market, and useful knowledge of school and institutional markets. Sixteen additional retail stores were opened in 1953, and by 1955 Tandy Leather was a thriving company with leased sales sites in 75 cities across the United States.

Tandy Leather became an attractive commodity and was purchased in 1955 by the American Hide and Leather Company of Boston, whose name changed in 1956 to General American Industries (GAI). Charles continued to maintain control of managing the Tandy Leather division while owned by GAI. During 1956, General American Industries acquired three other companies unrelated to the leather industry and a struggle for control of the parent company began. Charles saw the need to emancipate the company from continuing in the direction initiated by GAI. He used all his resources, raised additional money, and exercised his right to purchase the 500,000 shares of stock that were included in the original settlement. When the votes were counted on the day of that pivotal stockholders meeting, the Tandy group took management control of General American Industries.

== Acquisition of Merribee and RadioShack ==
In 1961, the company name was changed to Tandy Corporation. The corporate headquarters were also moved to Fort Worth, Texas, where Charles D. Tandy became the president and chairman of the board. Tandy Leather was operating 125 stores in 105 cities of the United States and Canada and expanding significantly. Tandy acquired the assets of Merribee Art Embroidery Co., manufacturer and retailer of needlecraft items, as well as five other companies, including Cleveland Crafts Inc. and brought on the owner, Werner Magnus, to help run the newly acquired Merribee division.

The first Tandy Mart had twenty-eight different shops all devoted to craft and hobby merchandise and included American Handicraft, Tandy Leather, Electronics Crafts and Merribee in an area of about 40,000 square feet. Charles Tandy became intrigued with the potential for rapid growth that he saw in the electronics retail industry during 1962. He found RadioShack in Boston, a mail order company that had started in the 1920s selling to amateur radio operators and electronics buffs. By April 1963, the Tandy Corporation acquired management control of RadioShack Corporation and within two years, RadioShack's $4 million (~$32.2 million in 2025) loss was turned into a profit under the leadership of Charles Tandy.

Sales were going well for Tandy during this time. Under the leadership of Lloyd Redd (president) and Al Patten (VP of Operations), the company prospered. The number of Tandy store-fronts skyrocketed over the next five to six years, growing from 132 sites in 1969 to 269 sites in 1975 as more and more people reveled in the excitement of Tandy. Ground broke in downtown Fort Worth for the construction of the Tandy Towers in 1975. The 18-story office building was initiated as phase I of a massive downtown development with plans to cover eight city blocks and become the new headquarters of the Tandy Corp. It contained an upscale retail shopping center with an indoor ice skating rink and had its own privately owned subway system.

The company's board of directors then announced a plan to separate Tandy's businesses into three distinct publicly held companies. The two new companies were named Tandycrafts, Inc. and Tex Tan-Hickok, Inc. This plan was publicized as a strategy to provide intensive leadership and tailored management of the three distinct and diverse businesses of the company, each of which recently had reached a substantial size. With this transition, RadioShack and Tandy Leather Company were no longer under the same corporate umbrella. Wray Thompson was promoted to president of Tandy Leather Company in 1976 and Dave Ferrill was promoted to the position of National Sales Manager; they oversaw 288 stores. Although they opened their 300th store that year, the popularity of Nature-Tand's products had begun to slide.

Charles Tandy died on November 4, 1978, at the age of 60. Concurrently, key stakeholders began to question the direction of the company. Wray Thompson subsequently resigned from his position as president and later started The Leather Factory with Ron Morgan, which eventually purchased Tandy Leather Corporation in 2000.

== Computers ==
Tandy's wordmark as used on its computer products

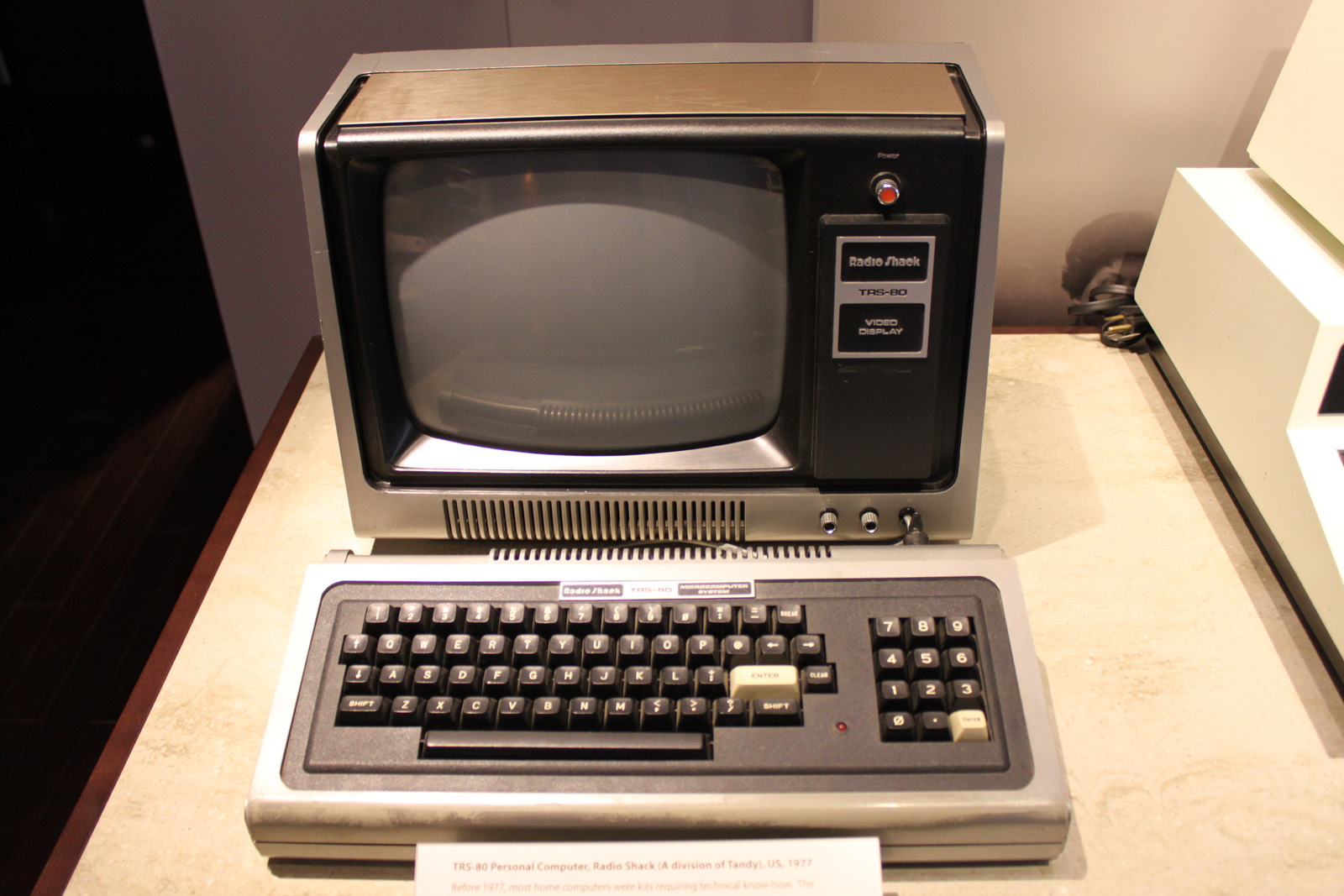
TRS-80 Model I (1977)

We've got a very easy business. We get up in the morning, and the only thing we have to do is figure out how to beat IBM, Apple, AT&T, and Japan, Inc.

— John V. Roach, Tandy CEO, 1988

Tandy was one of three companies (along with Commodore International and Apple) that started the personal computer revolution in 1977 by introducing complete pre-assembled microcomputers instead of a kit. Their TRS-80 (1977) and TRS-80 Color Computer ("CoCo") (1980) line of home computers were popular in the years before the IBM PC became commonplace, and had wide distribution in Radio Shack stores at a time when there were few computer stores.

Tandy had 60 Radio Shack Computer Centers by 1980, and expected to have 250 Radio Shack stores that sold its entire computer product line by the end of 1981. By then computers were the most important part of Tandy's sales. The company attempted to monopolize software and peripheral sales by keeping technical information secret and not selling third-party products in Tandy-owned stores. An experimental Tandy computer store at company headquarters sold non-Tandy products until the company banned doing so. A market research company reported in 1981 that not selling others' products slowed Tandy's growth, and predicted that competitors would benefit.

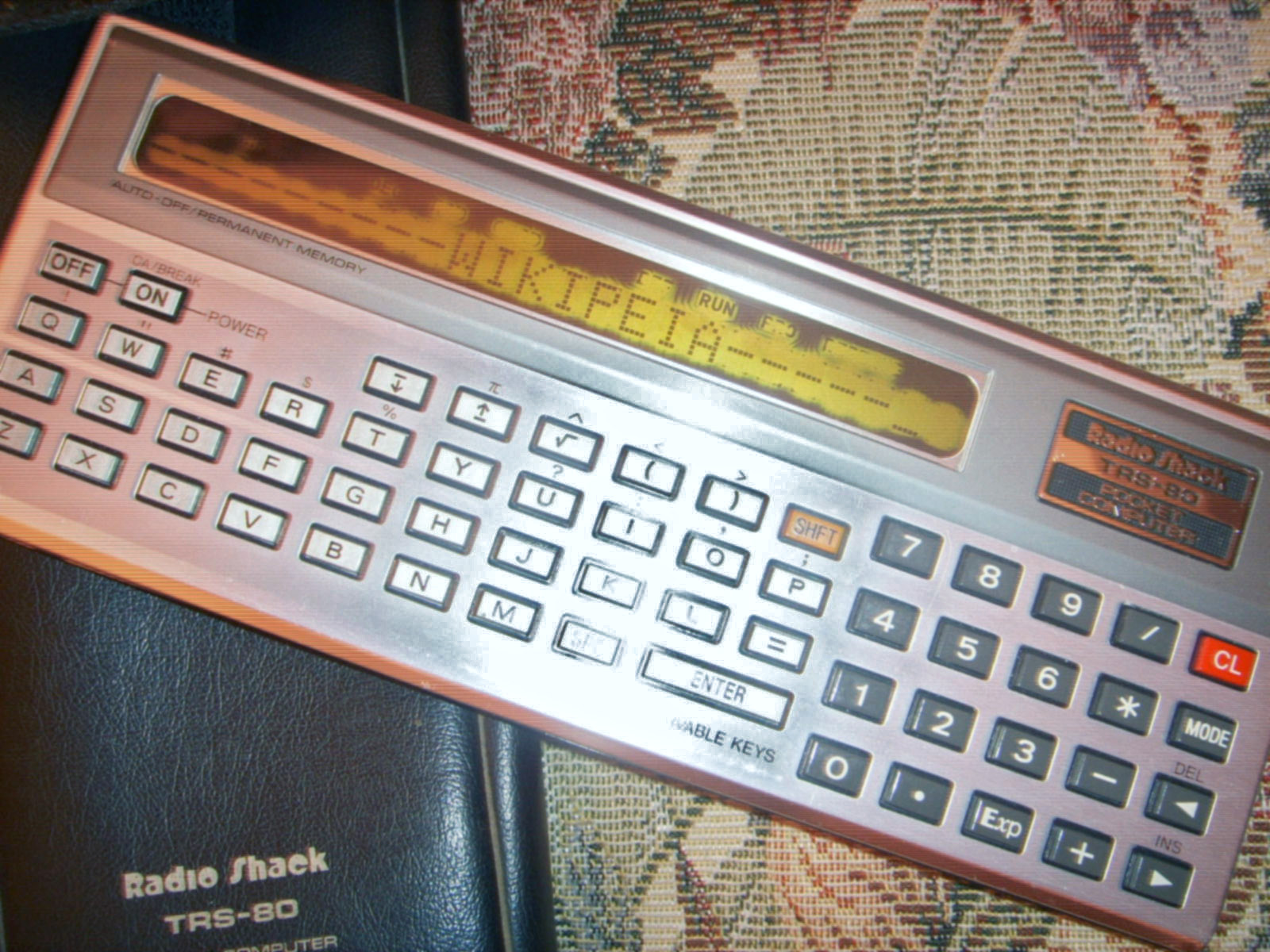
TRS-80 Pocket Computer

Discussing the report, Wayne Green, publisher of 80 Microcomputing, warned that the company might have become overconfident from defeating "poorly financed and inadequately managed competitors", and that IBM and others would not likely be "as myopic and hidebound as Radio Shack". He wrote that had Tandy continued its experiment, "they might have a couple of thousand Tandy Computer Centers around the country, instead of the Byte Shops and Computerlands we now see. And Tandy would have had a lot more control over Apple and other upstarts". In 1982 he wrote that while its thousands of stores were once a "considerable advantage" over competitors, "the Shack is falling way behind in sales outlets and thus in sales ... we've seen the Apple come along and, with fewer outlets, pass the TRS-80 by in sales". Green warned that the company needed to make "soul-searching, perhaps painful, decisions". Citing a recent study by Time finding what he described in May 1983 as "a severe loss" of Tandy market share, Green said "Until some major changes are made in the approach to computer sales by most Radio Shack stores, I expect that businessmen will be put off by the adjacent counters of toys and gadgets".

Tandy's market share—as high as 60% at one time—indeed declined by 1983 because of competition from the IBM PC and lack of third-party products. Tandy adopted the IBM PC compatible architecture with the Tandy 1000 and Tandy 2000 (1983–1984). The 1000 helped Tandy achieve a 25% personal computer market share in 1986, tied with Apple and in second place behind IBM.

In 1982, Tandy Corporation entered into a development contract with Oklahoma-based software company Dorsett Educational Systems, known for its 25 years pioneering educational technology. The deal resulted in dozens of titles being released for the TRS-80 Color Computer.

Radio Shack stores sold TRS-80 computers with other products, while Radio Shack Computer Centers only sold computers. Non-company-owned franchises sold Radio Shack products, including computers, and non-Radio Shack items. Value-added resellers distributed relabelled versions of Tandy computers. Despite selling computers through old-fashioned, department-store-like Sunday-newspaper inserts that emphasized price instead of technology and functionality, by 1980 InfoWorld described Radio Shack as "the dominant supplier of small computers". and in 1981 "one of the best marketers in the computer industry". Adam Osborne that year described Tandy as "one of the great enigmas of the industry". He wrote of his amazement that a company "with so few roots in microcomputing" was the "number-one microcomputer manufacturer" while "selling computers out of Radio Shack stores, no less?" Green suggested in 1982 that stores separate computers from toys to convince "middle-income (-class) customers that Radio Shack stores are not primarily dealers in schlock for the unwary lower-income people". James Fallows that year wrote, while praising Scripsit, that he at first "had snobbishly resisted Radio Shack because of the low-rent appearance of its products". A BYTE reviewer admitted in 1983 that he at first dismissed the Model 100 "as a toy" because he saw it in a store next to a radio-controlled car, stating that "it's too bad that Radio Shack is associated with toys and CB radio" when the computer "shows tremendous planning and foresight".

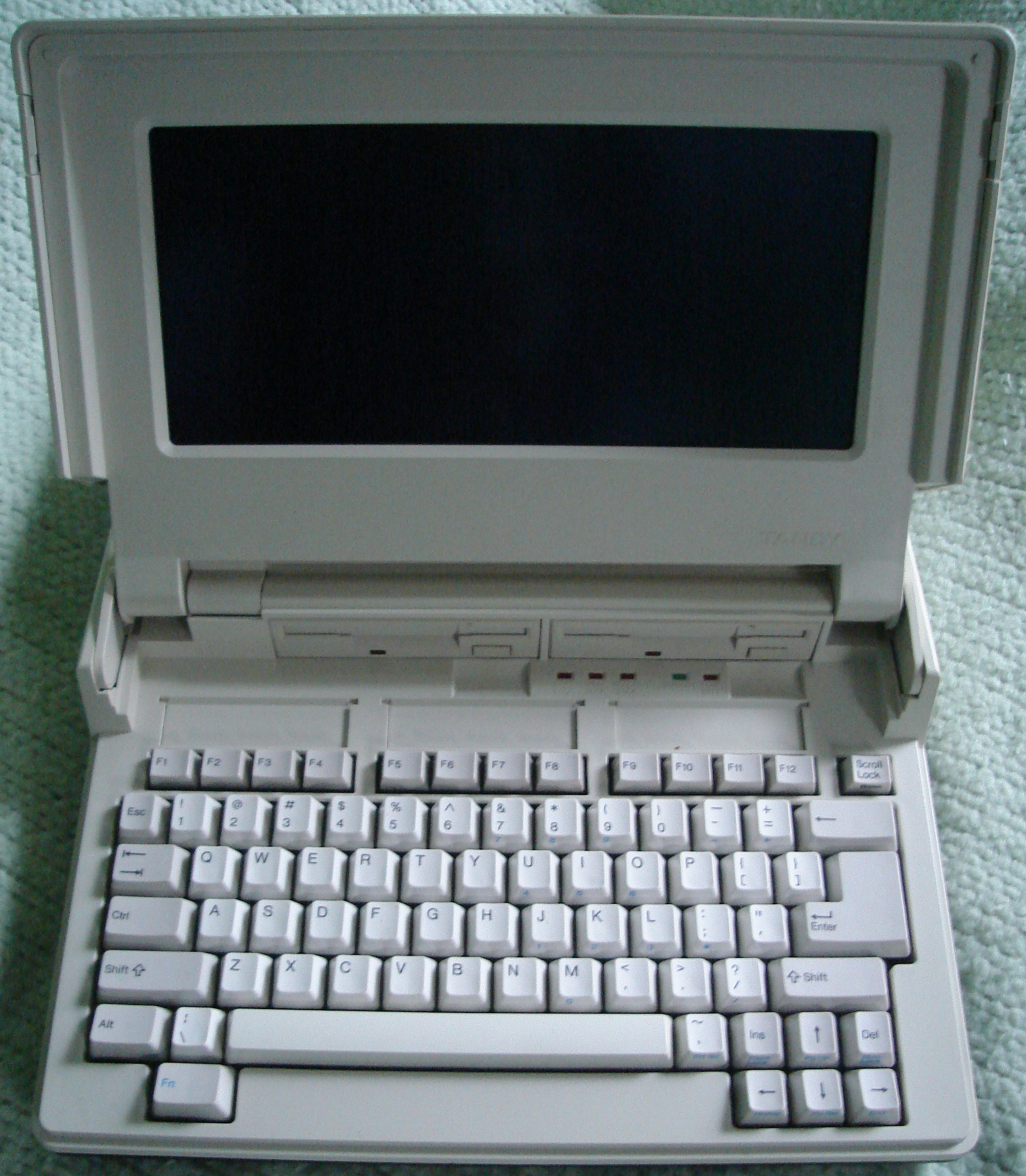
A Tandy laptop computer, the 1400LT (1987)

In 1984, a sell-side analyst stated that Tandy had an "impressive product line, magnificent distribution capability, control of the whole process from manufacturing through distribution, and a reasonably nimble management that is willing to move with the product cycle". Roach described his company as "basically a distribution system for high technology products", with 500 Radio Shack Computer Centers and 800 to 900 "Plus" stores, Radio Shack locations with a large computer section. By then computers were 35% of Radio Shack sales; the Model 100 was the world's best-selling notebook computer, while Tandy was the leading Unix vendor by volume, selling almost 40,000 units of the 68000-based, multiuser Tandy Model 16 with Xenix,

The company's association with consumers likely hurt a 1982 attempt at direct sales to companies, despite Tandy avoiding the Radio Shack name. It began selling all computers using the Tandy brand because, an executive admitted, "we were told by customers that the Radio Shack name was a problem in the office". In the mid-1980s, it began selling products compatible with non-Tandy products such as the IBM PC for the first time, acknowledging that Tandy could no longer only sell software for its own computers, and customers could buy products for Tandy PC compatibles elsewhere. The company also mandated in 1986 an IBM-like dress code for store employees. In 1987, BYTE wrote that "Tandy might now be offering the most extensive lines of computer products in the world", including the $99 Color Computer 2, $499 Model 102 notebook, various PC compatibles, and the $3,499 Tandy 6000 Xenix system. The company acquired GRiD Systems in March 1988. Grid Systems was a laptop manufacturer whose products included the GRiD Compass (1982), GridCase (1985), GridLite (1987), and GridPad (1989) tablet computer.

Tandy also produced the short-lived Tandy 1100FD and Tandy 1100HD notebooks. Released in 1989, the 1100 Series was based on the popular NEC V20 processor clocked at 8 MHz. Tandy also produced software for its computers in the form of Tandy Deskmate. That same year, Tandy introduced the WP-2, a solid-state notebook computer that was a rebadged Citizen CBM-10WP. Eventually, in the early 1990s, Tandy Corporation sold its computer-manufacturing business to AST Computers, and all Tandy computer lines were terminated. When that occurred, Radio Shack stores began selling computers made by other manufacturers, such as Compaq. In 1992, the company introduced the Tandy Zoomer, a predecessor to the Palm Pilot, designed by Jeff Hawkins. Also that year, the company produced an interactive, multimedia CD-ROM player called the Tandy Video Information System (VIS). Like the Tandy computers, it was based on the IBM PC architecture and used a version of Microsoft Windows. Tandy even produced a line of floppy disks, and continued producing IBM PC compatibles until the end of the Intel 486 era.

== Tandy stores ==
In 1973, Tandy Corporation began an expansion program outside its home market of the US, opening a chain of RadioShack-style stores in Europe and Australia under the Tandy name. The first store to open was in Aartselaar, Belgium on August 9, 1973. The first UK store opened October 11, 1973, in Hall Green, Birmingham. Initially, these new stores were under direct ownership of Tandy Corporation. In 1986, Tandy Corporation formed its subsidiary InterTAN as separate entity though connections between them were still visible. For example, catalogue number compatibility was maintained so that the same catalogue number in both companies would refer to the same item.

Tandy stores in the UK sold mainly own-brand goods under the 'Realistic' label and the shops were distinguished on the high street by continuing to use written sales receipts and a cash drawer instead of a till as late as the early 1990s. Staff were required to take the name and address of any customer who made a purchase, however small, in order to put them on the company's brochure mailing list, which often caused disgruntlement. A popular feature of Tandy stores was the free battery club, in which customers were allowed to claim a certain number of free batteries per year. In the early 1990s, the chain ran the 'Tandy Card' store credit card scheme and the 'Tandy Care' extended warranty policies which were heavily marketed by staff.

Logo of the resurrected UK Tandy Corporation

In 1999, the UK stores were acquired by Carphone Warehouse, as a part of an expansion strategy that saw the majority of the Tandy stores converted either to Carphone Warehouse or Tecno photographic stores. In May 2000, the Tandy name was dropped and the official name became RadioShack Corporation. By 2001, all former Tandy stores had been converted or closed. A small number of the stores were sold to a new company called T2 Retail Ltd formed by former Tandy (Intertan UK) employees, Dave Johnson, Neil Duggins and Philip Butcher who continued the RadioShack-style theme for a while, but these stores also closed in 2005. A new company called T2 Enterprises now continues using the old T2 Retail web presence as an exclusively on-line retailer stocking a range of RadioShack products and other electronics. In 2012, Tandy Corporation Ltd, a UK company, acquired the UK rights to the Tandy brand from RadioShack. It now operates as an on-line retailer of electronic components and kits at tandyonline.com.

In Australia, Tandy Electronics stores were sold to Woolworths in 2001. After Woolworths purchased Tandy Electronics, despite owning rival Dick Smith Electronics, both continued to trade as separate entities. In February 2009, Woolworths announced that it would be closing all Tandy Electronics stores within the next two years; all Tandy Electronics stores were closed on June 24, 2012.

In Canada, the InterTAN stores were sold to rival Circuit City Inc. The stores were branded as RadioShack, however, because Circuit City lost the naming rights. Later, all of these RadioShacks were re-branded as "The Source by Circuit City" (now called just The Source). Some of these stores have since closed. In 2009, Circuit City sold The Source to Bell Canada Enterprises (BCE).

== Other retail outlets ==
=== Color Tile ===
In 1975, Tandy spun off Color Tile, a chain of tile and flooring stores, along with its other non-electronic businesses in 1975 to TandyCrafts.

=== McDuff Electronics, VideoConcepts ===
In 1985, Tandy acquired two chains, McDuff Electronics and VideoConcepts; the latter was previously owned by Eckerd Corporation. Most of these stores were closed as part of a 1994 restructuring plan, with 33 converted to RadioShack or Computer City Express stores. Remaining McDuff stores were closed in 1996.

=== The Edge in Electronics ===
The Edge in Electronics, a now-defunct chain of boutique stores geared toward mall customers interested in fashionable personal and portable name brand electronics, debuted in 1990 and had 16 stores as of December 1993. One of the last stores open closed in San Antonio, Texas, in 2001.

=== Incredible Universe ===
The Incredible Universe concept was Tandy's attempt to compete with other electronics giants such as Best Buy, Circuit City, and Lechmere. A joint venture between Tandy Corporation and Trans World Entertainment, the first two stores, located in Arlington, Texas, and Wilsonville, Oregon, opened in 1992. Each Incredible Universe store stocked more than 85,000 items, and the stores' sales personnel did not work on commission. Sales were below average compared to Tandy's profitable RadioShack line, and by late 1996, the company had decided to sell or close all 17 Incredible Universe stores. Many Incredible Universe stores were acquired by Fry's Electronics.

=== Computer City ===
Computer City was a supercenter concept featuring name-brand and private label computers, software and related products; acquired in 1991, these supplanted the original Radio Shack Computer Center chain, which closed that year. Computer City became the first International Computer Superstore with over 100 locations in six countries. In 1995, Computer City was recognized as the 2nd fastest retailer to hit $1 (~$2.00 in 2025) billion in sales. In 1996, it was recognized as the second fastest retailer to hit $2 (~$3.78 billion in 2025) billion in sales. (Sam's Club was the fastest retailer to hit $1 billion.) Alan Bush, former EVP of RadioShack and Jim Hamilton, known as the "Father of Computer Retailing," were the strategists behind the rapid growth and success. The Computer City stores were later sold to CompUSA.

=== O'Sullivan Industries ===
Logo of O'Sullivan Industries

In 1983, Conroy sold O'Sullivan Industries, a furniture manufacturer, to Tandy Corporation. In 1994, Tandy Corporation offered O'Sullivan as a public company. In 1999, O'Sullivan was purchased for about $350 million (~$635 million in 2025) by investment group OSI Acquisition, an affiliate of Brockman, Rosser, Sherrill & Co., L.P. (BRS).

== See also ==
- Coleco, another leather company that eventually sold digital electronics
- Tandy-12
