= Far Far Away =

Far Far Away may refer to:

== Songs ==
- "Far Far Away" (song), by Slade, 1974
- "Far Far Away", by Battle Beast from Unholy Savior, 2015
- "Far Far Away", by Blackmore's Night from Secret Voyage, 2008
- "Far, Far Away", by Five Iron Frenzy from Five Iron Frenzy 2: Electric Boogaloo' 2001
- "Far, Far Away", by Wilco from Being There, 1996
- "Far-Far-Away", composed by Ned Rorem, 1963

== Other uses ==
- Far Far Away, a fictional place in the Shrek franchise
  - Far Far Away, a Shrek-inspired zone at Universal Studios Singapore
- Far Far Away, a 2013 novel by Tom McNeal
- Classic Star Wars: A Long Time Ago... Volume 7: Far, Far Away, a Star Wars comic book omnibus volume
- Far Far Away (film), a 2021 Hong Kong film
- "Part Six: Far, Far Away", an episode of Ahsoka

== See also ==
- "Far Far Far Away", a song by Lisa Mitchell from Welcome to the Afternoon
- Far Away (disambiguation)
