= Fireaway Pizza =

Pizza restaurant chain from UK

- Industry: Restaurants
- Founded: 2017
- Founder: Mario Aleppo
- Headquarters: Milton Keynes, Buckinghamshire, England
- Number of locations: 157
- Area served: Worldwide
- Products: pizza, slides and desserts
- Number of employees: over 1000
- Website: www.fireaway.co.uk

Fireaway Pizza is a British pizza restaurant chain. The chain operates on a franchise model system, as well as a distribution network to all of its stores in England. The majority of products are imported from Italy.

== History ==
Fireaway Pizza was founded by Mario Aleppo in Rosehill Sutton in April 2016 and the first Fireaway Store was opened. The name Fireaway Pizza came from a spin-off of Subway but using a stone fired oven, and giving customers the opportunity to customize their own pizza.

In 2017, two more Fireaway locations were opened and business operations were moved to Milton Keynes, Buckinghamshire.

In 2019, Fireaway Pizza received Small Pizza chain of the year award at the Pizza and Pasta awards show (PAPA).

In 2021, Fireaway opened their first international location in Amsterdam. In November, Fireaway pizza donated over 1,000 pizzas to emergency service workers, charities and homeless people in Worcester and was awarded the 2021 Rising Star award at the PAPAs.

In 2022, Fireaway Pizza local chain was expanded with 48 brand-new restaurants in the UK. In the same year, 6.5% of the company was sold for £1,200,000.

In 2023, 35 new stores were opened, bringing the total to 150 stores worldwide.

In 2024, Fireaway Pizza's restaurants were opened in Dubai, Turkey and Portugal.

In 2025, Fireaway Pizza's restaurants were opened in Spain and The Cayman Islands.
