= List of TRS-80 games =

This list contains video games created for the monochrome TRS-80 computers.

== Model I and III ==
There are 539 commercial games on this list.

Name	Year	Developer	Publisher	Notes
13 Ghosts	1983		Radio Shack	
3-D Tic-Tac-Toe	1980		Adventure International	
3D Brick Away	1982		Avalon Hill	
7 Card Stud			Tandy Corporation	
Acey Deucy	1978		Creative Computing Software	
Acorn Pinball	1981		Acorn Software Products, Inc.	
Adventure	1981		Creative Computing Software	
Adventure #10: Savage Island Part One	1981		Adventure International	
Adventure #11: Savage Island Part Two			Adventure International	
Adventure #12: The Golden Voyage			Adventure International	
Adventure #13: The Sorcerer of Claymorgue Castle	1983		Adventure International	
Adventure #1: Adventureland	1979		Adventure International	
Adventure #2: Pirate Adventure	1981		Adventure International	
Adventure #3: Mission Impossible	1981		Adventure International	
Adventure #4: Voodoo Castle	1980		Adventure International	
Adventure #5: The Count	1980		Adventure International	
Adventure #6: Strange Odyssey	1981		Adventure International	
Adventure #7: Mystery Fun House	1981		Adventure International	
Adventure #8: Pyramid of Doom	1981		Adventure International	
Adventure #9: Ghost Town	1980		Adventure International	
Adventures in Mythology	1985		Saguard Software	
Air Traffic Controller	1980		Creative Computing Software	
Airmail Pilot	1979		Instant Software	
Alien Cresta	1981		Displayed Video Ypsilanti, MI, USA	
Alien Defense Mod I only	1981		Soft Sector Marketing, Inc.	
Alien Defense Mod III only	1981		Soft Sector Marketing, Inc.	
Android Nim	1978	Leo Christopherson	80-NW Publishing Co.	BASIC/ML hybrid
Andromeda Conquest	1982		Microcomputer Games	
Androne	1983		Tandy Corporation	
Ants	1979		Synergistic Solar, Inc.	
Apple Panic	1982	Yves Lempereur	Funsoft	clone
Apples	1982		Computerware	
Arcade Bomber Scramble	1981		Kansas Software	
Arex	1983		Adventure International	
Arkanoid	1987		Tandy Corporation	
Armchair Admiral	1987		Eversoft Games	
Armored Patrol	1981	Wayne Westmoreland, Terry Gilman	Adventure International	Battlezone clone
Asteroid	1980	Michael Wall	Instant Software	
Asylum	1981	Frank Corr Jr., William Denman	Med Systems	
Asylum II	1982		Med Systems	
Atom	1983		Tandy Corporation	
Attack Force	1980	Bill Hogue, Jeff Konyu	Big Five Software	Targ clone
B-1 Nuclear Bomber	1983		Microcomputer Games	
Bable Terror	1982		Funsoft, Inc. USA	
Back-40	1980		Adventure International	
Backgammon	1980		Adventure International	
Backgammon + Blackjack	1977		Radio Shack	
BagitMan	1983		Aardvark Software	
Baja	1980		Computer Shack	
Bandit	1982		Arcade Development Project	
Barricade!	1979		Small System Software	
Basketball	1980		Acorn Software Products, Inc.	
Battle Station	1981		Dubois & McNamara Software	
Battleground	1980		Instant Software, Inc.	
Battlestar Galactica	1979		Cybermate	
Bedlam	1982		Radio Shack	
Beewary	1979		80-NW Publishing Co.	
Bingo Math	1983		Tandy Corporation	
Blackbeard's Island	1984		Tom Mix Software	
Blackjack	1978		Rainbow Computing, Inc.	
Blackjack Coach	1982		DynaComp	
Blitzkrieg	1982		Ala Video	
Blochead	1983		Computerware	
Blockade			Personal Software	
Board Games-1	1980		Creative Computing Software	
Bounceoids	1982		Cornsoft Group, The	
Bowling			Tandy Corporation	
Breakout	1980		Software Innovations	
Breakthru	1983		Microcomputer Games	
Bridge 2.0	1979		DynaComp	
Bridge Challenger	1978		Personal Software, Inc.	
Bridge Master	1982		DynaComp	
Bureaucracy - A Paranoid Fantasy	1987		Infocom	
Caladuril - Flame of Light	1987		Diacom Products	
Caladuril 2 - Weatherstone's End	1988		Diacom Products	
Capture + Simon	1980		Adventure International	
Car Racer			Software Innovations	
Cashman	1983		Computer Shack	
Casino Game Pack	1979		Radio Shack	
Castle Guard	1982		Tandy Corporation	
Catalyst	1983		Computer Shack	
Catch 'Em	1982		Aardvark Software	
Cave Walker	1986		Spectral Associates	
Chamelion	1982		Computerware	
Checker King	1980		Tandy Corporation	
Checkers-80	1979		Radio Shack	
Chess	1980		Tandy Corporation	
Chessd	1984		Software Dynamic	
Chicken	1982		Soft Sector Marketing, Inc.	
Chopper Strike	1983		Computer Shack	
Circus	1982		Molimerx, Ltd.	
Classic Solitaire			Eversoft Games	
Close Assault	1983		Microcomputer Games	
Clowns & Balloons	1982		Tandy Corporation	
Color Backgammon	1980		Tandy Corporation	
Color Cubes	1981		Tandy Corporation	
Color Invaders	1981		Computerware	
Color Outhouse	1983		Computer Shack	
Colorbowl Football	1982		Computerware	
Combat Galactique			Sivea S.A.	
Commbat	1981		Adventure International	
Computer Baseball Strategy			Microcomputer Games	
Computer Foreign Exchange	1983		Microcomputer Games	
Computer Mindreader	1979		Programma International, Inc.	
Computer Statis-Pro Baseball			Microcomputer Games	
Computer Stocks and Bonds	1982		Intelligence Quest Software	
Concentration (Adventure International)	1980		Adventure International	
Concentration (Programma)	1979		Programma International, Inc.	
Conflict 2500	1981		Microcomputer Games	
Conquering Armies	1988		Mitchell Software	
Conquest of Chesterwoode	1981		Adventure International	
Cosmic Fighter			Big Five Software	Astro Fighter clone
Cosmic Intruders	1980		Ala Video	
Cosmic Patrol	1980		Instant Software, Inc.	
Crazy Painter	1982		Cornsoft Group, The	
Cribbage 2.0	1981		DynaComp	
Crush, Crumble and Chomp	1983		Epyx	
Cyborg	1982	Bill Dunlevy and Douglas Frayer	Computer Shack	distributed by Computer Shack
Cyrus Chess	1982		Tandy Corporation	
Dancing Demon	1980	Leo Christopherson	Radio Shack	BASIC/ML hybrid
Danger in Orbit	1981		Instant Software, Inc.	
Deadline	1982		Infocom	
Death Dreadnaught	1980		Programmer's Guild, The	
Death Maze 5000	1980		Med Systems Software	
Death Trap	1980		Dick Smith Electronics	
Death Trap!			Dick Smith Electronics	
Defense Command			Big Five Software	non-scrolling clone of Defender
Demise	1981		Acorn Software Products, Inc.	
Demon			Mumford Micro Systems CA, USA	
Demon Attack	1984		Tandy Corporation	
Demon Seed	1982		Trend Software	
Demon Venture #1: Reign of the Red Dragon	1982		Adventure International	
Demon Venture #2: Mystery of the Four Doors			Adventure International	
Desert Patrol	1983		Arcade Animation	
Devil's Dungeon	1977		Engel Enterprises	
Devil's Tower	1982		Fantastic Software	
Dig Out			Computer Shack	
Dino Wars	1980		Tandy Corporation	
Dnieper River Line	1983		Microcomputer Games	
Donut Dilemma	1984		Fun Division	
Doodle	1979		Programma International, Inc.	
Doodle Bug	1982		Computerware	
Double Feature: Spook House + Toxic Dumpsite			Adventure International	
Doubleback	1982		Tandy Corporation	
Downland	1984		Tandy Corporation	
Dr. Chips	1979		Adventure International	
Dragonfire	1982		Tandy Corporation	
Dragonquest	1981		Programmer's Guild, The	
Draw5			Wilson Software Div.	
Duel-N-Droids	1981		Acorn Software Products, Inc.	
Dungeon Explorer	1980		Software Exchange	"single player game of adventure and combat based on Dungeons and Dragons"
Dunjonquest: Morloc's Tower	1980		Automated Simulations, Inc.	
Dunjonquest: Sorcerer of Siva	1981		Automated Simulations, Inc.	
Dunjonquest: Upper Reaches of Apshai	1982		Automated Simulations, Inc.	
Earthquake San Francisco 1906	1983		Adventure International	
Ecology Simulations-1	1979		Creative Computing Software	
Ecology Simulations-2	1979		Creative Computing Software	
El Diablero	1982		Computerware	
Eliza			Tandy Corporation	psychiatrist Q&A simulation
Empire			CLOAD	based on Hamurabi and Santa Paravia en Fiumaccio
Empire of the Overmind	1981		Microcomputer Games	
Enchanter	1983		Infocom	
Escape	1984		Bernzeszoft	
Everest Explorer	1979		Acorn Software Products, Inc.	
Expeditions			MECC Minnesota Educational Computing Corp.	
F for Freddie			Kansas City Systems	
Fasteroids (renamed later to Planetoids)	1981	Greg Hassett	Adventureworld / Adventure International	
Fastgammon	1978		Quality Software Reseda, CA, USA	
Fifteen Numbers	1979		Programma International, Inc.	
Fire Copter	1983		Adventure International	
Five Speed Racer	1979		Programma International, Inc.	
Flying Saucers	1979		Radio Shack	
Foodwar	1983		Arcade Animation	
Football	1980		Tandy Corporation	
Football Manager			Addictive Games	
Formula One			Tandy Corporation	
Fortress	1981		Soft Sector Marketing, Inc.	
Fortress II	1982		Soft Sector Marketing, Inc.	
Fredericksburg	1983		Microcomputer Games	
Frog	1980		Adventure International	
Frog Race	1982		Algray	
Frogger	1981		Cornsoft Group, The	
Fury	1983		Computer Shack	
G.F.S. Sorceress	1983		Microcomputer Games	
Galactic Empire			The Software Exchange	
Galactic Revolution	1980		Adventure International	
Galactic Trader	1980		Adventure International	
Galactic Trilogy	1980		Adventure International	
Galaxy Invasion			Big Five Software	Galaxian clone
Galaxy Invasion Plus	1982		Big Five Software	
Games Pack I	1978		Radio Shack	
Games Pack Three	1984		Radio Shack	
Games Pack Two	1984		Radio Shack	
Games Pack-1	1979		Creative Computing Software	
Games Tape T1	1980		Applied Technology Pty., Ltd.	
Games Tape T2	1980		Applied Technology Pty., Ltd.	
Games-2	1979		Sensational Software Creative Computing Software label	
Gammon Gambler	1981		Radio Shack	
Geography	1979		Creative Computing Software	
Ghost Hunter			Dubois & McNamara Software	
Gin Champion	1982		Tandy Corporation	
Gobbleman			Beam Software	
Gobbler	1981		Superior Software	
Gobbling Box	1986		Misosys, Inc.	
Gomoku-Renju	1983		Tandy Corporation	
Graphic Mars	1984		Aardvark Software	
Graphic Pyramid	1984		Aardvark Software	
Gunfighter	1981		Tandy Corporation	
Guns of Fort Defiance	1981		Microcomputer Games	
Hail to the Chief	1980		Creative Computing Software	
Hamburger Sam	1983		Displayed Video Ypsilanti, MI, USA	
Hamurabi	1978		Circle Enterprises, Inc.	
Haunted House			Creative Computing Software	
Hearts 1.5	1980		DynaComp	
Hellfire Warrior	1980		Automated Simulations	Dungeon crawl
Hercules	1982		Ala Video	
Hexapawn	1978		Creative Computing Software	
Hi-res Life	1978		Rainbow Computing, Inc.	
Hidden Valley	1982		Adventure International	
Hoppy	1981		Dubois & McNamara Software	
House of Thirty Gables	1981		Instant Software, Inc.	
Hunt/Huntwriter	1979		Programma International, Inc.	
Hypergate Centurion + Hypergate Patrol	1982		Synergistic Software	
Hyperlight Patrol	1980		Fantastic Software	
Ice Master	1983		Arcade Animation	
In the Hall of the Mountain king	1982		Radio Shack	
Indoor Soccer	1982		Pel-Tek	
Infidel	1983		Infocom	
Insect Frenzy			Dubois & McNamara Software	
Interactive Fiction: Dragons of Hong Kong	1981		Adventure International	
Interactive Fiction: His Majesty's Ship Impetuous	1981		Adventure International	
Interactive Fiction: Local Call for Death	1980		Adventure International	
Interactive Fiction: Six Micro Stories	1980		Adventure International	
Interactive Fiction: Two Heads of the Coin	1979		Adventure International	
Invaders	1979		Level IV Products	
Invaders!			Tandy Corporation	Space Invaders clone
Invaders-Plus	1980		Level IV Products	
Invasion Force			Tandy Corporation	
Invasion Orion	1979		Automated Simulations, Inc.	
Jabbertalky	1981		Automated Simulations, Inc.	
Jet Fighter Pilot	1980		Instant Software, Inc.	
Jovian	1982		Computer Shack	
Jumpy	1982		Pel-Tek	
Jungle Boy	1983		Displayed Video Ypsilanti, MI, USA	
Jungle Raiders	1981		Displayed Video Ypsilanti, MI, USA	
Kid Venture #1: Little Red Riding Hood	1979		Adventure International	
Kid Venture #2: Twas the Night before Christmas	1981		Adventure International	
Kid Venture #3: Old McDonald's Farm	1981		Adventure International	
Killer Gorilla	1983		Displayed Video Ypsilanti, MI, USA	
King of the Hill	1983		Smith & Jones Software	
Klendathu			Tandy Corporation	
Knight's Quest + Robot Chase + Horse Race	1978		Instant Software, Inc.	
Knossos	1981		Med Systems	
Koronis Rift	1987		Epyx	
Kriegspiel II	1980		Ramware	
L'Invasion des Extras-terrestres	1983		Sivea S.A.	
Labryrinth	1982		Aardvark Software	
Labyrinth	1980		Med Systems	
Lafayette Escadrille	1983		Discovery Games	
Lair of the Dragon	1987		Misosys, Inc.	
Laser Defense	1981		Med Systems	
Learning Fun I: Scurve Invaders	1980		Dick Smith Electronics	
Life Two	1980		Adventure International	
Life Ver. 7.4			Superior Software	
LifeTwo	1979		80-NW Publishing Co.	
Lords of Karma	1981		Microcomputer Games	
Lost Colony			Acorn Software	
Lunar Lander	198?		Adventure International	
Lying Chimps	1980		Adventure International	
Maces & Magic #1: Balrog	1981		Adventure International	
Maces & Magic #2: Stone of Sisyphus	1981		Adventure International	
Maces & Magic #3: Morton's Fork	1981		Adventure International	
Mad Mines	1982		Funsoft	
Magic Carpet	1983		Radio Shack	
Marathon	1983		Afabear Software	
Master Reversi	1981		Instant Software, Inc.	
Masters' Golf	1981		Ramware	
Maze-80	1979		Programma International, Inc.	
Meta-Trek	1980	Brandon Rigney III	The Alternate Source	
Meteor Mission	1980		Big Five Software	
Meteor Mission 2	1980		Big Five Software	
Meteor Mission II			Big Five Software	Lunar Rescue clone
Micro-80 Pinball Machine	1980		Micro-80, Inc.	
Microbes	1982		Tandy Corporation	
MicroChess	1978		Micro-Ware, Ltd.	
Microcosm I			Basics & Beyond	
Microcosm II			Basics & Beyond	
Microcosm III			Basics & Beyond	
Microsoft Adventure	1980		Microsoft	Commercial release of Colossal Cave Adventure
Midway	1982		Avalon Hill	
Midway Campaign			Avalon Hill Software	
Mind Warp	1980		Instant Software, Inc.	
Mind-Roll	1989		Tandy Corporation	
Minefield	1979		Programma International, Inc.	
Misadventure #5: Naked Nightmare	1982		Softcore Software Co.	
Missile Attack	1981		Adventure International	
Mission Impossible Adventure	1979		Creative Computing Software	
Mission Impossible Adventure + Voodoo Castle Adventure	1980		Creative Computing Software	
Monster Mash & Battleship	1980		Micro-80 Inc.	
Monster Maze	1981		Tandy Corporation	
Monty Plays Monopoly	1982		Radio Shack	
Monty Plays Scrabble	1982		Radio Shack	
Mt Doom	1983		Adventure International	
Musical Yat-C	1981		Adventure International	
Mutant Invasion	1982		Micro-Systems Software	
Mysterious Adventures #1: Arrow of Death Part 1	1981		Molimerx, Ltd.	
Mysterious Adventures #2: Arrow of Death Part 2	1982		Molimerx, Ltd.	
Mysterious Adventures #5: Feasibility Experiment	1982		Molimerx, Ltd.	
Mysterious Adventures #6: The Time Machine	1982		Molimerx, Ltd.	
Name That State Quiz	1980		Synergistic Solar, Inc.	
Neutroid	1983		Fun Division	
Nightwalker	1983		Adventure International	
Nim	1979		Programma International, Inc.	
Nine Games for Pre-School Children			Ramware	
Nominoes	1981		DynaComp	
North Atlantic Convoy Raider	1980		Microcomputer Games	
NukeWar	1983		Microcomputer Games	superpower nuclear missile simulation
Nukliex	1984		JMG Software International	
Olympic Decathlon	1980		Microsoft	arcade simulation of the Olympic Games decathlon event
One On One	1983		Tandy Corporation	
Other Ventures #2: The Curse of Crowley Manor	1981		Adventure International	
Other Ventures #3: Escape from Traam	1981		Adventure International	
Other Ventures #4: Earthquake - San Francisco 1906	1982		Adventure International	
Owl Tree	1980		Adventure International	
Pac Droids	1982		Programmer's Guild, The	
Pachinko	1979		Programma International, Inc.	
Pacifica	1980		Rainbow Computing, Inc.	
Package One	1979		Simutek Computer Products, Inc.	
Paddle Pinball	1981		Radio Shack	
Panic Button	1985		Tandy Corporation	
Panik	1982		Fantastic Software	
Parsector V	1980		Synergistic Solar, Inc.	
Pegasus and the Phantom Riders	1985		Spectral Associates	
Penetrator			Beam Software	
Penguin	1983		Displayed Video Ypsilanti, MI, USA	
Pentominoes	1979		Programma International, Inc.	
Pigskin	1981		Acorn Software Products, Inc.	
Pinball	1980		Tandy Corporation	
Pirate Adventure	1979		Creative Computing Software	
Planet Miners			Avalon Hill Software	
Planet Raider	1982		Aardvark Software	
Planetfall			Infocom	
Planetoids	1981		Adventure International	
Poker Party	1980		DynaComp	
Poker Pete			Quality Software	
Poker Tournament	1981		Adventure International	
Polaris	1981		Tandy Corporation	
Poltergeist	1982		Tandy Corporation	
Pong			Instant Software	
Pooyan	1983		Tandy Corporation	
Popcorn	1981		Tandy Corporation	
Pork Barrel			Ramware	
Pot O'Gold I	1980		Rainbow Computing, Inc.	
Pot O'Gold II	1980		Rainbow Computing, Inc.	
Predator	1989		Tandy Corporation	
Pro-Pix	1982		Adventure International	
Pro-Pix '81	1981		Adventure International	
Project Nebula	1981		Tandy Corporation	
Project Omega	1981		Adventure International	
Pursuit Games	1980		Creative Computing Software	
Pyramid 2000			Tandy Corporation	Colossal Cave clone
Pyramix	1987		Colorventure	
Quasar Commander	1980		Tandy Corporation	
Quest	1982		Aardvark Software	
Quick Quiz			Radio Shack	
Quick Watson	1978		Radio Shack	
Quix	1984		Tom Mix Software	
Quiz Machine	1979		Programma International, Inc.	
Raaka-Tu	1981		Radio Shack	
Radio Ball			Tandy Corporation	
Rainbow's Casino	1980		Rainbow Computing, Inc.	
Reactoid	1983		Tandy Corporation	
Rear Guard	1981		Adventure International	
Regilian Worm	1983		Software Guild, The	
Reign of the Red Dragon			Adventure International	
Revenge of Rivet Race	1983		Quality Software & Consulting, Inc. Kansas City, MO, USA	
Reverse	1978		People's Computer Co.	
Robot Attack			Big Five Software	Berzerk clone
Roman Checkers	1981		Tandy Corporation	
Roulette	1979		Programma International, Inc.	
Salvo Battleship	1979		Semi-Sentient Software New York, NY, USA	
Santa Paravia en Fiumaccio	1979		Instant Software	
Sargon	1978		Hayden Book Co.	
Sargon II	1979		Hayden Book Co.	
Scarfman	1981		Cornsoft Group, The	Pac-Man clone
Scramble	1980		Adventure International	
Scrap Crane	1979		Device Oriented Games, Inc.	
Sea Dragon	1982		Adventure International	
Seastalker	1984		Infocom	
Shamus	1984		Tandy Corporation	
Shark Attack	1980		Adventure International	
Shooting Gallery	1982		Tandy Corporation	
Showdown	1981		Adventure International	
Silver Flash	1981		Adventure International	
Simutek I	1979		Adventure International	
Simutek II	1981		Adventure International	
Skiing	1980		Tandy Corporation	
Sky Warrior	1982		Adventure International	
Slag	1980		Adventure International	
Snake Eggs	1978		80-NW Publishing Co.	
Social and Economic Simulations	1979		Creative Computing Software	
Soko-Ban	1988		Tandy Corporation	
Solar Search			Colorado Software Associates	
Sorcerer			Infocom	
Space Ace 21	1981		Cornsoft Group, The	
Space Assault	1981		Tandy Corporation	
Space Battles	1979		Level IV Products	
Space Castle	1982		Cornsoft Group, The	
Space Colony	1980		Adventure International	
Space Evacuation	1981		DynaComp	
Space Games-3	1980		Creative Computing Software	
Space Intruders			Adventure International	
Space Warp	1980		Radio Shack	ASCII game loosely based on Star Trek
Space Invaders (Dick Smith)			Dick Smith Electronics	
Space Invaders (Silvea)	1981		Sivea S.A.	
Space Rocks	1981		Acorn Software Products, Inc.	
Space Shootout	1981		Displayed Video Ypsilanti, MI, USA	
Sparrow Commander	1982		Instant Software, Inc.	
Spider Mountain + Lost Dutchmans Gold	1979		Fantasy Rider Creations	
Spider Mountain Adventure	1980		Programmer's Guild, The	
Spidercide	1983		Tandy Corporation	
Spox	1982		Software Guild, The	
SR-71	1984		Tom Mix Software	
Star Blaze	1983		Tandy Corporation	
Star Cruiser	1980	Strategems Co.		
Star Fighter	1983		Aardvark Software	
Star Scout	1981		Adventure International	
Star Trader	1984		Computerware	
Star Trader Orion	1980		Automated Simulations, Inc.	
Star Trap			Tandy Corporation	
Star Trek			Adventure International	
Star Trek + Star Wars	1980		Rainbow Computing, Inc.	
Star Trek 3.5	1980		Adventure International	
Star Trek II	1978		Instant Software, Inc.	
Star Trek III			Micro-Mage	
Star Trek III.5	1980		Ramware	
Starfighter			Adventure International	
Starfleet Orion	1978		Automated Simulations, Inc.	
Starquest	1983		Radio Shack	
Starquest: Rescue at Rigel			Automated Simulations	
Stellar Escort			Big Five Software	
Stellar Life Line			SRB Software	
Strategy Games	1980		Creative Computing Software	
Stratos	1982		Adventure International	
Strike Force	1982		Melbourne House	
Strip Dice Concentration			Adventure International	
Stronghold	1983		Computer Shack	
Stud5			Wilson Software Div.	
Sub Battle Simulator	1987		Epyx	
Sub Polaris	1983		Aardvark Software	
Super Bustout	1981		Tandy Corporation	
Super Maze			Quality Software	
Super Nova			Big Five Software	Asteroids clone
Supreme Ruler	1982		JMG Software	
Suspended	1983		Infocom	
Swamp War	1981		Instant Software, Inc.	
T80-FS1 Flight Simulator			Sublogic	
Tai Pan	1980		Adventure International	
Taipan!	1979		Cybernautics	
Tank	1979		Programma International, Inc.	
Tanktics	1983		Microcomputer Games	
Tawala's Last Redoubt	1981		Broderbund	
Telengard	1982		Microcomputer Games	
Temple of Apshai	1979		Automated Simulations	
Temple of the Sun	1981		Programmer's Guild, The	
Tennis	1982		Tandy Corporation	
The Amazing Blackjack Machine	1981		Adventure International	
The Andrea Coco	1985		Saguard Software	
The Battle of Zeighty	1982		JMG Software International	
The Black Hole	1982		Funsoft, Inc. USA	
The Datestones of Ryn	1981		Automated Simulations	
Eliminator	1981		Adventure International	Defender clone
The Great Race	1980		Adventure International	
The Human Adventure	1980		Med Systems	
The Institute	1981		Med Systems	
The Magic of Leo Christopherson			Ramware	
The Mean Checker Machine	1980		Adventure International	
The Mean Checker Machine Ver.2	1981		Adventure International	
The New Starship Voyages	1981		Synergistic Solar, Inc.	
The Playful Professor	1980		Med Systems	
The Search of Elsoliado	1983		Adventure International	
The Sledge of Rahmul + Merlin's Treasure	1983		Adventure International	
The Sword of Roshon	1981		Radio Shack	
The Witness			Infocom	
Threshold-Zero	1982		Alternate Source, The	
Thunder Road Adventure	1980		Programmer's Guild, The	
Time Bandit	1983		Computer Shack	
Time Runner	1982		Funsoft, Inc. USA	
Time Traveler	1980		Krell Software	
Time Trek	1978		Personal Software, Inc.	
Tournament Chess	1984		Rapidynamic Software, Inc.	
Tower of Fear	1981		Programmer's Guild, The	
Tram	1982		Micro-Systems Software	
Treasure Quest	1980		Adventure International	
Treasury Pak			Spectral Associates	
Tribble Trap II	1979		Programma International, Inc.	
TRS-80 Opera	1980		Adventure International	
Trucker and Streets of the City	1981		Creative Computing Software	
Tube-Frenzy	1982		Aardvark Software	
Tunnels of Fahad	1981		Adventure International	
Tutankam	1983		Aardvark Software	
Up Periscope	1981		Ramware	
V.C. - VietCong	1983		Microcomputer Games	
Valdez	1979		DynaComp	
Venturer	1982		Aardvark Software	
Vexus	1982		Soft Sector Marketing, Inc.	
Video Checkers	1978		Compu-Quote	
Volcano Hunter	1984	David Smith	Lap Video Entertainment	Side view arcade game with over 200 screen.
Voodoo Castle Adventure	1979		Creative Computing Software	
Voyage of the Valkyrie	1981	Leo Christoperson	Advanced Operating Systems Sams	BASIC/ML hybrid
Wacky Food	1983		Arcade Animation	
Warfish	1979		Creative Computing Software	
Warpath	1981		Ramware	
Warrior of RAS #1 - Dunzhin	1982		Screenplay	
Warrior of RAS #2 - Kaiv	1982		Med Systems	
Weerd	1982		Big Five Software	
Weerd!			Big Five Software	
Welcome U.S.A.	1980		Adventure International	
Where in the World is Carmen Sandiego?	1986		Broderbund	
Wildcatting	1981		Tandy Corporation	
Wizard's Castle	1980		Alternate Source, The	
Word Challenge	1980		Adventure International	
Word Games			MECC Minnesota Educational Computing Corp.	
Wordwatch	1979		Instant Software, Inc.	
Worg			Simutek Software	
World Series	1981		Ramware	
Worlds of Flight	1984		Tom Mix Software	
Wumpus	1978		Creative Computing Software	
X-Wing II	1980		Ramware	
Xenos	1982		Radio Shack	
Z-Chess	1979		Adventure International	
Z-Chess III	1981		Adventure International	
Zaxxon	1983		Radio Shack	
Zeus	1983		Aardvark Software	
Zone Runner	1987		Tandy Corporation	
Zork I	1980		Infocom	
Zork II	1980		Infocom	
Zork III	1980		Infocom	
Zossed in Space	1980		Adventure International	

== See also ==
- List of software for the TRS-80
- List of TRS-80 Color Computer games
