= Robon =

1983 video game

- Publisher: Softek
- Programmer: Andrew Beale
- Platform: ZX Spectrum
- Release: 1983
- Genre: Multidirectional shooter

Robon is a clone of Berzerk for the ZX Spectrum written by Andrew Beale and released by Softek in 1983. The game's documentation refers to it as a "version of the popular arcade game".

== Reception ==
Crash magazine said: "This Frenzy / Berserk game, unlike most of Softek’s other programs, is not very good. At the slowest of the nine skill levels it's a bit boring, and at the fastest it's quite meaningless. The usual format is followed; electrified walls, robots, unkillable 'Raboks' which leave exploding mines behind".

== See also ==
- Robot Attack
- K-Razy Shoot-Out
- Thief
