= Pinball (disambiguation) =

Pinball is a type of physical arcade game with a metal ball.

Pinball may also refer to:

== Music ==
- Pinball (album)
  - Pinball (Mike and Tony Seltzer album), 2024
  - Pinball (Marius Neset album), 2015
  - Pinball II a 2025 album by Mike and Tony Seltzer
- "Pinball" (song), by Brian Protheroe, 1974

== Video games ==
- Pinball (1980 video game), a computer game for the TRS-80
- Pinball (1984 video game), a game for the Nintendo Entertainment System (NES)
- Pinball, a 1979 Microvision game

== Other uses ==
- Pinball: The Man Who Saved the Game, a 2022 biographical comedy-drama film
- Pinball (file system), the OS/2 HPFS file system
- Pinball (helicopter), nickname of the Bell P-63 Kingcobra when used as a live gunnery target
- Pinball (journal), an online literary magazine
- Pinball Clemons (born 1965), Canadian Football League player, coach, and executive
- Pinball, a sport on the TV series Robot and Monster
- Pinball, a fictional Marvel Comics character in the Squadron Supreme
- Pinball Number Count (or Pinball Countdown) is a collective title referring to 11 one-minute animated segments on the children's television series Sesame Street

== See also ==
- Pinball museum (disambiguation)
