= Money Madness =

Money Madness may refer to:

- Money Madness (1948 film), a film noir mystery film
- Money Madness (1917 film), an American silent crime drama film
- Money Madness (video game), a 1980 video game

== See also ==
- Madness, Money & Music, a 1982 album by Sheena Easton
- Money Mad (disambiguation)
