= Whodunit (disambiguation) =

A whodunit is a plot-driven story of the detective variety in which the puzzle is paramount.

Whodunit or Whodunnit may also refer to:

== Music ==
- "Whodunit" (song), a 1977 song by Tavares
- "Who Dunnit?", a 1981 song by Genesis from the album Abacab
- "¿Whodunit?", a 2016 song by Mild High Club from the album Skiptracing

== Television ==
- Whodunnit? (UK game show), a 1972–1978 British television game show
  - Whodunnit? (U.S. game show), a 1979 American game show adaption of the British version
- Whodunnit? (2013 TV series), a 2013 American reality competition television series
- "Whodunnit?" (Is It Legal episode) (1995)
- "Whodunnit?" (Not Going Out), a 2019 episode
- "Whodunit?" (Cheers episode) (1985)
- Who-Dun-It (TV series), a 1969 British television series

== Other ==
- Whodunnit (play), a 1977 play by Anthony Shaffer
- Who-Dun-It?, a 1979 TRS-80 game
- Who Dunit, a 1988 arcade video game
- Who Dunnit, a 1995 pinball machine
- Whodunit, a murder mystery boardgame published by Selchow and Righter in 1972

== See also ==
- Who Done It? (disambiguation)
