= Star Cruiser =

A star cruiser or starcruiser is a common spaceship designation in some science fiction and science fantasy media.

Star cruiser or starcruiser may also refer to:

- Star Cruiser (1980 video game), developed by Strategems Co. for the TRS-80 Model I Level II
- Star Cruiser (1988 video game), developed by Arsys Software for the PC-8801 and X1 computers
- Star Wars: Galactic Starcruiser, space travel themed hotel experience at Walt Disney World from 2022 to 2023
