= K-Razy Shoot-Out =

1981 video game

- Developer: K-Byte
- Publishers: K-Byte; CBS Software; CBS Electronics (5200)
- Designers: Keith Dreyer; Torre Meeder
- Platforms: Atari 8-bit, Atari 5200
- Release: 1981: Atari 8-bit 1983: Atari 5200
- Genre: Multidirectional shooter

K-Razy Shoot-Out is a clone of the arcade video game Berzerk developed by K-Byte, a division of Kay Enterprises, and released for Atari 8-bit computers in 1981. The game was written by Torre Meeder and Keith Dreyer, and was the first Atari 8-bit cartridge from a third-party developer. An Atari 5200 version followed in 1983. The team of Dreyer and Meeder also wrote the 1983 Atari 8-bit game Boulders and Bombs.

K-Razy Shoot-Out is part of a series of titles with the "K-" prefix, including K-Razy Kritters and K-Star Patrol. All of them were published on cartridge. After CBS Software purchased K-Byte, the games were published under the CBS brand, including the Atari 5200 port of K-Razy Shoot-Out.

== Gameplay ==
As in Berzerk, the goal is to destroy all of the robots occupying a series of randomly generated mazes. In Berzerk, if the player takes too long to clear a maze, an indestructible bouncing ball ("Evil Otto") drives the player to an exit. K-Razy Shoot-Out uses a visible timer instead. If the timer runs out, the game ends. If the player exits a maze without clearing it, the player has to replay one or two mazes without getting points.

== Reception ==
K-Razy Shoot-Out sold 35,000 copies by June 1982. John J. Anderson of Creative Computing Video & Arcade Games, wrote that as a Berzerk clone, "the only element that's missing is the speech ... lots of fun, and has a great deal of staying power". It won the 1983 Arcade Award for "Best Arcade/Action Computer Game" from Electronic Games magazine. The Berzerk similarity was mentioned, but also that the game has "a unique flavor" on its own way.

== See also ==
- Robot Attack
- Robon
- Thief
