= Flying Saucers (video game) =

1979 video game

- Developer(s): Robert Arnstein
- Publisher(s): Radio Shack
- Programmer(s): Robert Arnstein
- Platform(s): TRS-80
- Release: 1979
- Genre(s): Fixed shooter

Flying Saucers is a fixed shooter video game written by Robert Arnstein for the TRS-80 and published by Radio Shack in 1979.

== Gameplay ==
Flying Saucers is a game in which the player has a limited amount of time to destroy as many alien saucers as able. There are three types of saucers: large, small, and a super saucer that destroys all visible saucers when shot. There are score penalties for shots that do not hit anything and for letting a saucer escape.

== Reception ==
Glenn Mai reviewed Flying Saucers in The Space Gamer No. 39. Mai commented that "Overall, Flying Saucers is OK. However, I cannot recommend it because there is a better game with the same name (and price!) on the market, Air Raid".
