= Money Mad =

Money Mad may refer to:

- Money Mad (1908 film), an American crime film directed by D. W. Griffith
- Money Mad (1918 film), a 1918 American mystery film directed by Hobart Henley
- Money Mad (1934 film), a British drama film directed by Frank Richardson

== See also ==
- Mad Money, a finance television series hosted by Jim Cramer
- Mad Money (film), a 2008 film
- Mad Money (play), an 1869 Russian play
- Money Madness (disambiguation)
