= Dungeon of Death =

1978 video game

- Publisher: Instant Software
- Programmers: Gordon Walton; John Polasek
- Platform: PET
- Release: 1979
- Genre: Role-playing

Dungeon of Death is a fantasy role-playing video game developed by Instant Software. The game was released on the 8K Commodore PET.

== Gameplay ==
Dungeon of Death is a single-player fantasy role-playing game in which players explore a twelve-level dungeon in search of the Holy Grail, guarded by the dragon Smaug. The objective is to retrieve the Grail and return to the surface. The game uses a top-down perspective, with movement controlled through the Commodore PET's numeric keypad.

The player's character is assigned attributes including strength, agility, wisdom and experience. While exploring the dungeon, players encounter monsters, treasure chests, magical potions and hidden traps. Combat offers several options, including attacking, evading and casting spells. Players can accumulate experience and treasure before returning to the surface to improve their character's abilities. The game features six different spells, including Fireball, Sleep and Mind Blast.

== Reception ==
In the December 1980 issue of Dragon, Mark Herro described Dungeon of Death as one of several computer games influenced by Dungeons & Dragons. He praised its low retail price of $7.95, noting that it was the least expensive game of its type he had encountered. However, he criticized its rigid gameplay structure, lengthy play sessions and inability to save progress. Despite these shortcomings, Herro considered the game reasonable value for players seeking a single-player role-playing experience.

In July 1981, the Toronto PET Users Group newsletter The TORPET gave the game a "Poor" rating. The reviewer, identified by the initials JDO, found it initially entertaining but criticised its excessive length and repetitive gameplay.

== Reviews ==
- Creative Computing
