= Stellar Shuttle =

1982 video game

- Publisher: Broderbund
- Designer: Matt Rutter
- Platform: Atari 8-bit
- Release: 1982
- Genre: Action

Stellar Shuttle is an action game written by Matt Rutter for Atari 8-bit computers and published in 1982 by Broderbund. The game is similar to the arcade Lunar Rescue released in 1979 by Taito.

== Gameplay ==
In-game screenshot

The main object of Stellar Shuttle is to guide the shuttle down to the surface of the planet, rescue the refugees and return them safely to the mothership.

On his way down the player must maneuver through the asteroid belt into one of the narrow landing wells on the planet's surface. The speed of the shuttle's descent can be adjusted by activating the shuttle's retro rockets. Once the player has landed, the nearest refugee will try to make it to the shuttle's safety. As soon as he is inside, the shuttle will take off for a rendezvous with the mothership.

For each level there are six refugees that have to be rescued one at a time. Once that has been done the player moves on to the next level.

== Reception ==
The Addison-Wesley Book of Atari Software 1984 gave it an overall rating C+ and concluded: "Stellar Shuttle is a nicely implemented game with a good graphics and sound effects. It offers a fine challenge, but doesn't have much depth, becoming repetitious after extended play".
