= Robot Attack =

1981 video game

- Developer: Big Five Software
- Publisher: Big Five Software
- Programmers: Bill Hogue; Jeff Konyu
- Platform: TRS-80
- Release: 1981
- Genre: Multidirectional shooter

Robot Attack is a clone of the multidirectional shooter arcade video game Berzerk. It written by Bill Hogue and Jeff Konyu for the TRS-80 and published by Big Five Software in 1981. It was the first game from Big Five to include speech.

== Gameplay ==
Robot Attack is a game in which the player fights against hostile robots aboard a space station. The player starts in a mazelike room full of robots, and the goal is to destroy the robots and exit the room. The maze walls, robots, and the robots' shots are all deadly. After a while in each room, an indestructible "flagship" appears which performs the same function as Evil Otto in Berzerk.

== Development ==
Bill Hogue recorded the voice lines on tape and digitized them through the TRS-80 cassette port.

== Reception ==
Ian Chadwick reviewed Robot Attack in Ares Magazine #12 and commented that "Robot Attack is highly recommended for the nimble fingered arcade buff and even more so for the curious programmer who wishes to discover the secrets behind the usual technique of voice replication used here. Another feather in the cap of Big Five".

Bruce Campbell reviewed Robot Attack in The Space Gamer No. 52. Campbell commented that "Robot Attack gets a high recommendation. It will quickly pay for itself by saving you quarters you are spending at the arcade".

== See also ==
- K-Razy Shoot-Out
- Robon
- Thief
