= Spectar =

1980 video game

- Developer: Exidy
- Publisher: Exidy
- Designer: Manuel Campos
- Platform: Arcade
- Release: 1980
- Genre: Maze
- Modes: Up to 2 players, alternating
- Arcade system: Exidy 6502

Spectar is a maze shooter released in arcades by Exidy as a sequel to Targ. The game depicts vehicular combat in a future world. The original game was released in November 1980 and a ROM upgrade was released in April 1981.

== Gameplay ==
Spectar is similar to Targ, but with enhancements. It adds blockades to the maze, breaking up the regular grid. The center of the maze has a number of twinkling stars that the player can pick up. In addition to finishing a level by destroying all enemies, the player can also finish the round by picking up all the dots.

Gameplay screenshot

The enemies change shape every round (and are worth more points for shooting as the levels increase). Five seconds and ten seconds into each round, a Spectar Smuggler is added, which fires at the player. When the first smuggler appears on the board, the background sound changes, until all smugglers have been destroyed.

The elements that make up the maze change with each level:

1. Shaded circle
2. Hollow circle with roughened edges
3. 3D wireframe cubes
4. Solid cross
5. Solid diamonds
6. Solid squares crossed with an 'X' shape
7. 3D wireframe pyramids
8. Hollow octagons
9. and subsequent levels: a shape that resembles a space invader with a hollowed out section in the centre that looks like a house

As each level is completed, a bonus of 1000 times the level number is awarded. The bonus does not further increment after level 9.

== Legacy ==
There were a number of bootlegged versions of Spectar released by Exidy rivals which had identical ROMs except for the title screen game names: Panzer and Phantom (released by Proel), Phantomas (Jeutel), and Rallys (Novar).

In 2008, H.R. Kaufmann, president of Exidy, released the original ROM images (ROM revisions 1 and 3) for Spectar into the public domain.
