= Targ (video game) =

1980 video game

- Developer(s): Exidy
- Publisher(s): JP: Sega; NA: Exidy
- Platform(s): Arcade
- Release: NA: June 1980; JP: July 1980
- Genre(s): Maze, shoot 'em up
- Mode(s): Single-player, multiplayer

Targ is a maze shoot 'em up developed by Exidy and released as an arcade video game in 1980. It depicts vehicular combat in a future world. It was released in North America by Exidy in June 1980 and in Japan by Sega in July.

It was listed by Play Meter as one of only two maze games among the top 20 highest-grossing arcade video games of 1980, which was dominated by space shoot 'em ups. Its success prompted Exidy to release Spectar, a sequel with improved graphics, in July 1980. A port of Targ was developed for the Atari 2600 by CBS Games, but never released.

== Gameplay ==
Screenshot

The locale, described by the game cabinet as "The Crystal City", is a 10x10 grid of roads demarcated by square buildings. The player, piloting the Wummel, which looks like a small green car, maneuvers through the maze trying to shoot enemies and avoid collisions with them. Most of the enemies consist of angry-looking red wedges known as Targs. Occasionally, a small cyan-colored Spectar Smuggler appears; shooting it scores a significant bonus. None of the enemies shoot back; their sole means of destroying the Wummel is ramming into it.

When all enemies are destroyed, a bonus is awarded and a new round starts. If the player takes too long to clear the board, the Targs' speed increases until they are traveling faster than the Wummel.

== Reception ==
Electronic Games stated in 1983 that Targ had "one of the most unique approaches to the maze-chase contest". In his 1981 video game guide How to Master the Video Games Tom Hirschfeld observed that "TARG is one game in which strategy must become almost reflex as the action quickens".

== Legacy ==
Attack Force for the TRS-80 is a clone of Targ released by Big Five Software in 1980.

Targ was sublicensed to Centuri, who manufactured it in a cocktail version.
