= Thief (Apple II game) =

1981 video game

- Developer(s): Bob Flanagan
- Publisher(s): Datamost
- Platform(s): Apple II
- Release: 1981
- Genre(s): Multidirectional shooter
- Mode(s): Single-player

Thief is an Apple II multidirectional shooter written by Bob Flanagan and published by Datamost in 1981. It is a clone of the 1980 arcade game Berzerk.

== Gameplay ==
The game puts the player in control of a thief that must make his way through simple mazes, though there are no objects to actually steal. Each level is populated by stocky, possibly robotic guards that converge on the player, and which the player must either shoot or evade.

== Reception ==
While acknowleding it as a video game clone of Berzerk, Machado Ignácio of Micro & Video complimented it as the best version of the game for the Apple line of computers. He disliked the lack of ability to shoot while walking but stating the game will please those who are tired of adventure games.

== See also ==
- K-Razy Shoot-Out
- Robon
- Robot Attack
