= Cosmic Patrol =

1980 video game

- Publisher: Instant Software
- Programmer: Jake Commander
- Platform: TRS-80
- Release: 1980
- Genre: Space combat simulator

Cosmic Patrol is a first-person space combat game programmed by Jake Commander for the TRS-80 Model I and III, published by Instant Software in 1980.

== Gameplay ==
Cosmic Patrol is a game in which the player pilots a Terran fighter with a mission to destroy the invading Quelons. The game is very similar to the 1978 Magnavox Odyssey² cartridge Cosmic Conflict!.

== Reception ==
Jon Mishcon reviewed Cosmic Patrol in The Space Gamer No. 34. Mishcon commented that "If you're really into video arcade, this is a good shoot-em-up. But it's doubtful you'd spend [the price] to master this at an arcade."

== Reviews ==
- Moves #55, p31
