= Bounty Bob Strikes Back! =

1985 video game

- Developer: Big Five Software
- Publishers: NA: Big Five Software; EU: U.S. Gold
- Programmer: Bill Hogue
- Artists: Curtis Mikolyski; Bill Hogue
- Platforms: Atari 8-bit, Atari 5200, Commodore 64, Amstrad CPC, ZX Spectrum, BBC Micro, Atari 7800
- Release: 1985: Atari 8-bit, 5200, C64, CPC, Spectrum
- Genre: Platform
- Mode: Single-player

Bounty Bob Strikes Back! is a platform game released as the sequel to Miner 2049er. It was designed and programmed by Bill Hogue for Atari 8-bit computers and published by his company, Big Five Software. The game adds a 3D look to the platforms and increases the level count from 10 to 25. As with the original, the Atari 8-bit version was initially released on ROM cartridge—now 40K versus the 16K of the previous game—and required 16K RAM. For the European market, U.S. Gold licensed it and released it on cassette, requiring 64K RAM, meaning it was limited to running on an XL or XE. Ports to the Atari 5200, Commodore 64, Amstrad CPC, and ZX Spectrum were released in 1985.

In 2001, (Note: The first version of the emulator, published in 2001, contains the "20010720" timestamp on its "Help/About..." window.) Bill Hogue released a combo of Miner 2049'er and Bounty Bob Strikes Back for free with a custom, embedded Atari 8-bit emulator.

== Gameplay ==
A level with two teleporters (Atari 8-bit)

Gameplay is similar to Miner 2049er in that the player must walk along every platform of a level within the time limit while avoiding mutants. Unlike the original, after losing a life, pieces of platforms remain covered and destroyed enemies do not reappear, thus making it easier to complete a level.

Bounty Bob adds a slight 3D effect to the platforms. There are 25 levels versus the original's 10.

== Development ==
Following the critical and financial success of his game Miner 2049er, programmer Bill Hogue began work on a game titled Scraper Caper in which Bounty Bob beaome a fire fighter. Although the game was heavily advertised, it was never released; Hogue instead created Bounty Bob Strikes Back.

On Atari systems, the game is a bank-switched cartridge of 40KB total program and data mapped onto 16KB of address space.

Bounty Bob Strikes Back was shown at the January 1985 CES and then, in April 1985, ads began appearing in magazines.

== Reception ==
The game reached number nine on Billboard's list of top-selling entertainment computer software in June 1985, despite clocking in at a hefty $49.95 (equivalent to $150 in 2025).

In Steve Panak's column for ANALOG Computing, he found the large number of screens and the different elements in them to be a strong point: "It is this variety which saves Bob from mediocrity." He didn't like the unskippable animations when a new entry is added to the high score table, especially as the scores only persist until the computer is turned off.

In the final issue of Your Sinclair, the ZX Spectrum version was ranked number 56 on "The Your Sinclair Official Top 100 Games of All Time." In 2004, the ZX Spectrum version was voted the 19th best game of all time by Retro Gamer readers in an article originally intended for a special issue of Your Sinclair bundled with Retro Gamer.

== Legacy ==
On reflecting on the sequel, Hogue said he thought it was a great follow-up to the original game, but "perhaps not the groundbreaking game we wanted it to be and I guess that still disappoints me."

In 2024, the current incarnation of Atari published an Atari 7800 cartridge that also works on the Atari 2600+ and the Atari 7800+.
