= Who Done It? =

Who Done It? may refer to:

- Who Done It? (1942 film), an Abbott and Costello film
- Who Done It? (1949 film), a Three Stooges short
- Who Done It? (1956 film), a British film comedy starring Benny Hill
- "Who Done It" (Dallas), an episode of Dallas
- "Who Done It?" (Yes, Dear), an episode of Yes, Dear
- "Who Done It", an episode of The Singing Detective

== See also ==
- Whodunit, a type of detective story
- Whodunit (disambiguation)
