= Meteor Mission II =

1982 video game

- Publisher: Big Five Software
- Programmers: Bill Hogue; Jeff Konyu
- Platform: TRS-80
- Release: 1982
- Genre: Shoot 'em up
- Mode: Single-player

Meteor Mission II (written as Meteor Mission 2 on the title screen) is a clone of the Taito arcade game Lunar Rescue released by Big Five Software for the TRS-80 home computer in 1982. It was written by Big Five co-founders Bill Hogue and Jeff Konyu.

== Gameplay ==
The game is similar in concept to Lunar Lander but adds a rescue element. The initial goal is to navigate a ship through a moving meteor belt and land on one of several landing pads. A small figure runs out from the side of the screen, enters the ship, and then the player must navigate and fire back through the meteor field and dock with the mothership.

== Development ==
The game was the fifth of seven arcade clones programmed for the TRS-80 by Bill Hogue and Jeff Konyu, who left the TRS-80 platform in 1982. Hogue previously wrote and published an unrelated game called Meteor Mission that was withdrawn from the market. He would later that year create the platform game Miner 2049er for the Atari 8-bit computers.

== Reception ==
Ian Chadwick reviewed Meteor Mission II in Ares Magazine #13 and commented that "the challenge is limited and the game is really not terribly exciting. This is prime stuff for the younger set but otherwise pale in comparison to other efforts".

A review in 80-U.S. stated that "the graphics in Meteor Mission II are very good", but that "sound effects are not very fancy". In the conclusion, the reviewer called it "well worth the $15.95" and "impossible to master to a point where it lacks challenge".

In a 2012 retrospective, Gamasutra wrote that "'inspired by' the early Taito classic Lunar Rescue, this Big Five Software effort remains a compelling gameplay experience".
