= Air Raid (1978 video game) =

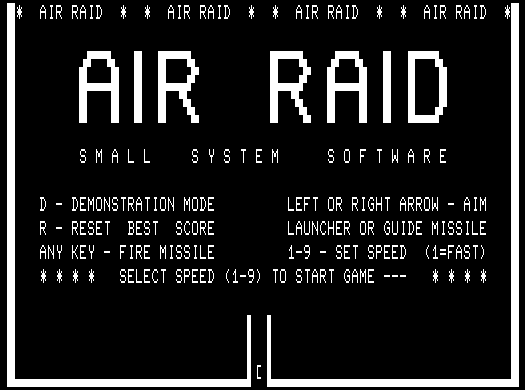
- Title screen
- Publisher: Small System Software
- Platform: TRS-80
- Release: 1978
- Genre: Fixed shooter

Air Raid is a fixed shooter video game published by Small System Software for the TRS-80 Level I or II in 1978. It is an adaptation of the game TARGET, developed for the Sol-20 by Steve Dompier.

== Gameplay ==
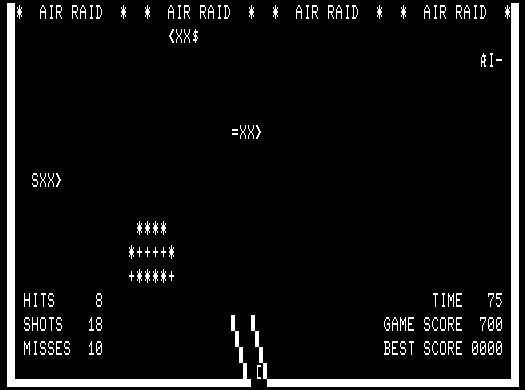
The display is made of ASCII characters.

The player uses a five direction missile launcher to destroy a random sequence of small quickly moving and large slowly moving aircraft (represented by ASCII characters) crossing the screen at seven altitudes. Collisions between two aircraft destroy both and produce a higher scoring parachute target, while aircraft destroyed by missiles explode, producing a cloud of debris capable of destroying aircraft below.

== Reception ==
Joseph T. Suchar reviewed Air Raid in The Space Gamer No. 30. Suchar commented that "Air Raid is the best arcade-type game I have played. As an arcade game it is unsurpassed and I recommend it."
