= Meta-Trek =

1980 video game

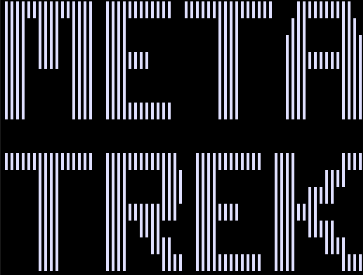
- Developer(s): Brandon Rigney III
- Publisher(s): The Alternate Source
- Designer(s): Brandon Rigney III
- Platform(s): TRS-80
- Release: 1980

Meta-Trek is a 1980 video game published on disk only by The Alternate Source for TRS-80 32K microcomputers.

== Contents ==
Meta-Trek is a Star Trek style game where the object is to explore and claim as many of the 256 available quadrants as possible, while destroying enemy Binarians.

== Reception ==
J. Mishcon reviewed Meta-Trek in The Space Gamer No. 37. Mishcon commented that "All in all, I would say that for those interested in a first rate original-Trek style game, this fits the bill nicely."
