= Miner 2049er =

1982 video game

- Cover art by Scott Ross depicting Bounty Bob
- Developer: Big Five Software
- Publisher: Big Five Software
- Programmer: Bill Hogue
- Platforms: Atari 8-bit: Atari 2600; Atari 5200; ColecoVision; IBM PC; TI-99/4A; Commodore 64; Apple II; FM-7; PC-88; Sharp X1; VIC-20; Super Cassette Vision
- Release: December 1982: Atari 8-bit; December 1982; Atari 2600; May 1983; Atari 5200; July 1983; TI-99/4A; October 1983; IBM PC; November 1983
- Genre: Platform
- Mode: Single-player

Miner 2049er is a platform game developed by Big Five Software and published in December 1982 for the Atari 8-bit computers. The player controls Mountie Bounty Bob through multiple levels of a mine, with the goal of traversing all of the platforms in each level all while avoiding enemies and within a set amount of time. Miner 2049er was widely ported, being released on a total of 22 different systems. Video magazine's editors commented on the game's popularity in January 1984, declaring it "the most widely played home electronic game of all time" and that "no home-arcade title has had the impact" that Miner 2049er had.

Programmer Bill Hogue blended ideas from popular arcade games, specifically Pac-Man (1980) and Donkey Kong (1981). It was the first game he developed for the Atari 8-bit computers. His previous games were monochromatic, and Hogue was excited at the opportunity to make the games in color for the system and wanted to surpass Donkey Kong. The resulting game has ten stages, most of them with unique gameplay elements. Big Five Software developed a custom 16 kilobyte ROM cartridge for the game compared to the standard 8 kilobyte cart for the Atari computers.

The game received positive press throughout 1983, appearing on best-of lists, with video game critics complimenting its colorful graphics, game design, and originality. After a cancelled attempt at a spin-off, the sequel Bounty Bob Strikes Back! was released in 1985, after which Big 5 closed its doors and Hogue stopped writing games. Richard Stanton, in his book A Brief History of Video Games (2015), said that Miner 2049er was generally forgotten in the wake of Super Mario Bros. (1985).

== Gameplay ==
The first level in Miner 2049er. The goal of each level is to survey the mine, indicated by the floor changing as Bounty Bob walks over it.

Miner 2049er features a Mountie named Bounty Bob who has been chasing a wanted criminal into a series of uranium mines. The object of the game is to complete all levels of the mine. To complete a stage, Bob must survey the mine by moving left and right across every part of the floor of each level. Each screen must be fully traversed within a set time indicated at the top of the screen to progress to the next level. Levels feature different hazards such as gaps in platforms and radioactive waste to be avoided and slow moving platforms such as lifts. Other modes of transportation rapidly move Bob across the stage. These include transporters that warp Bob to different numbered doors, a cannon that must be powered by collecting TNT, interconnected slides which force Bob down a path. The original Atari computer and Atari 5200 versions of the game have ten different levels. This was changed in some ports: the Atari 2600 cartridge had three, the ColecoVision version has eleven, while the TI-99/4A port has eight.

The player has a set amount of five lives indicated at the top of the screen. The player loses them by interacting with mutant enemies, falling from certain heights off a platform, and running out of time in a level. If Bob collects prospecting gear, such as candles and drills, the mutants turn green momentarily, making them vulnerable to Bob's touch. Points are awarded for collecting prospecting gear, eliminating enemies and the remaining time at the end of a level. After the game is over, the player can add their name to a high score list if they scored high enough. The high score is not saved after the cartridge is removed from the computer.

== Development ==
Miner 2049er was programmed by Bill Hogue of Big Five Software of Van Nuys, California. The company officially formed in 1980 and made computer games that were sold through mail order for the TRS-80 line of computers. Big Five Software's games were primarily clones of popular arcade games prior to Miner 2049er.

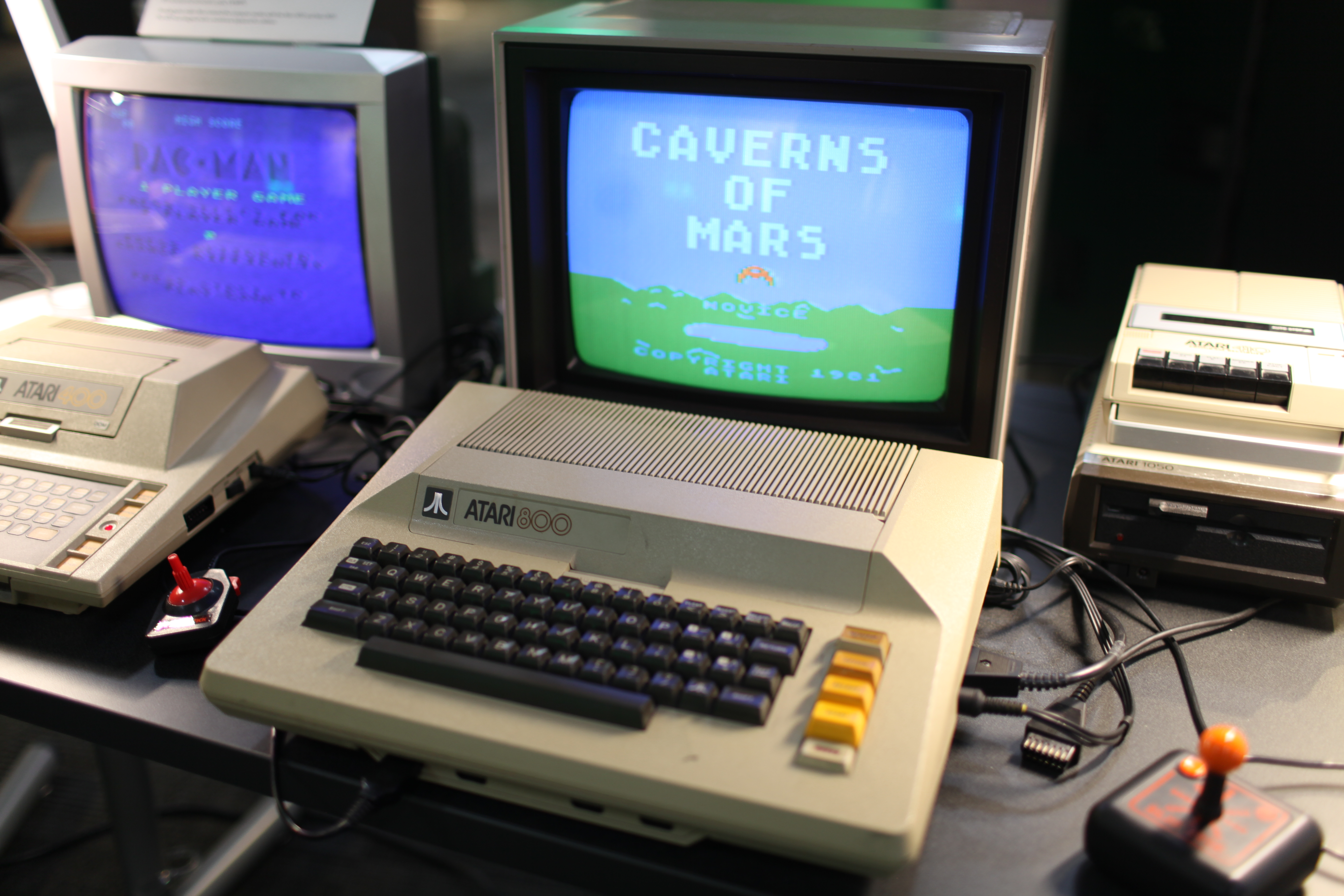
An Atari 800 computer displaying Caverns of Mars (1981). Miner 2049er programmer Bill Hogue was excited at the opportunity to work with the color capabilities of Atari computers.

After finding that the TRS-80 game market was in decline, and because its monochrome graphics were “limited”, the team refocused their attention to making games for the Atari 400 and 800 computer line. The game was Hogue's first published game for Atari computers. His team chose to develop for the line, as they felt it was the best combination of graphics and sound and that their cartridge games could not as easily be pirated. The graphics and audio in the game are credited to Curtis A. Mikolyski, Jeff Konyu, Kelly Bakst, and Hogue. It was the group's first color computer game. Hogue said he was obsessed with the advanced color capabilities of the Atari computers, which allowed for 15 different colors on the screen at any one time. A black-and-white version was developed for TRS-80 computers, but it was never released. The game was released on a 16-kilobyte ROM cartridge—a large amount of storage at the time, with other games for the Atari 400 and 800 computers such as Star Raiders (1980) and Missile Command (1981) requiring only 8-kilobyte ROMs. The group designed their own circuit boards to store the game at this size. The game was written in assembly language on an Atari computer.

The gameplay for Miner 2049er was developed first, followed later by the mining theme and narrative. Like their previous games, Big Five Software looked to arcade games for inspiration. Hogue recalled that the team really liked the climbing-aspects of Donkey Kong (1981) and believed they could improve on the gameplay formula. Hogue wanted to blend together the elements he found fun from different arcade games; specifically, the climbing from Donkey Kong and both traversing the entire screen and enemies who can be made vulnerable from Pac-Man (1980). He recollected that "I was never very good at Pac-Man, so I'm not sure why I borrowed any elements from the game." The mutant enemies were also inspired by Pac-Man, with Hogue discussing he used the arcade games ability to grab items to make enemies vulnerable to defeat for a short period of time. In Miner 2049er, Hogue described the level design "a somewhat tedious process" with all of the platforms that the player can step on being hard-coded, allowing level design to be tweaked by adjusting coordinates in the code. Other traversal methods such as the cannons and transporters were made as an iterative process, and that none of those gameplay mechanics were thought of ahead of time.

The games theme was inspired by the California Gold Rush of 1849, in which the miners were nicknamed 49ers. Some versions of the game feature a rendition of the song "Clementine" as part of the score. Hogue said the song was included as it was appropriate for the theme of a 1849 prospector. The game's narrative was later changed to be in the future to explain the presence of mutant enemies.

No less than 15 companies were scheduled to produce versions of Miner 2049er for various video game consoles, computers, and handheld machines. Mike Livesay designed the adaptations of the game for the Apple II computer and for ColecoVision. Livesay initially approached Micro Fun about adapting the game for ColecoVision but was turned down by the company, which stated that they did not want third-party games. Despite this, Livesay reverse-engineered the ColecoVision and developed his own kit for it based on the Apple II. Livesay eventually got Micro Fun to agree to develop the ColecoVision version of the game, allowing him time to make more levels for it.

== Release ==
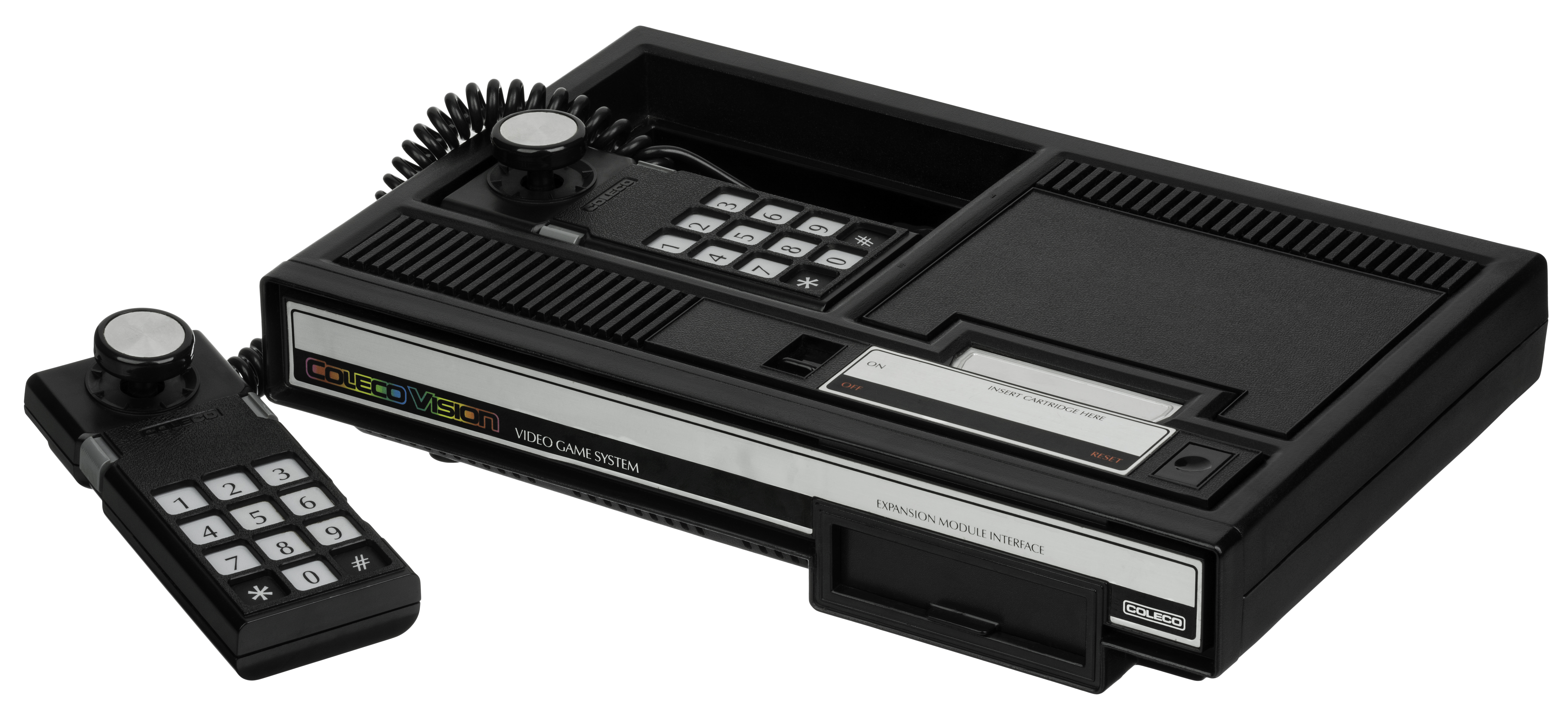
ColecoVision

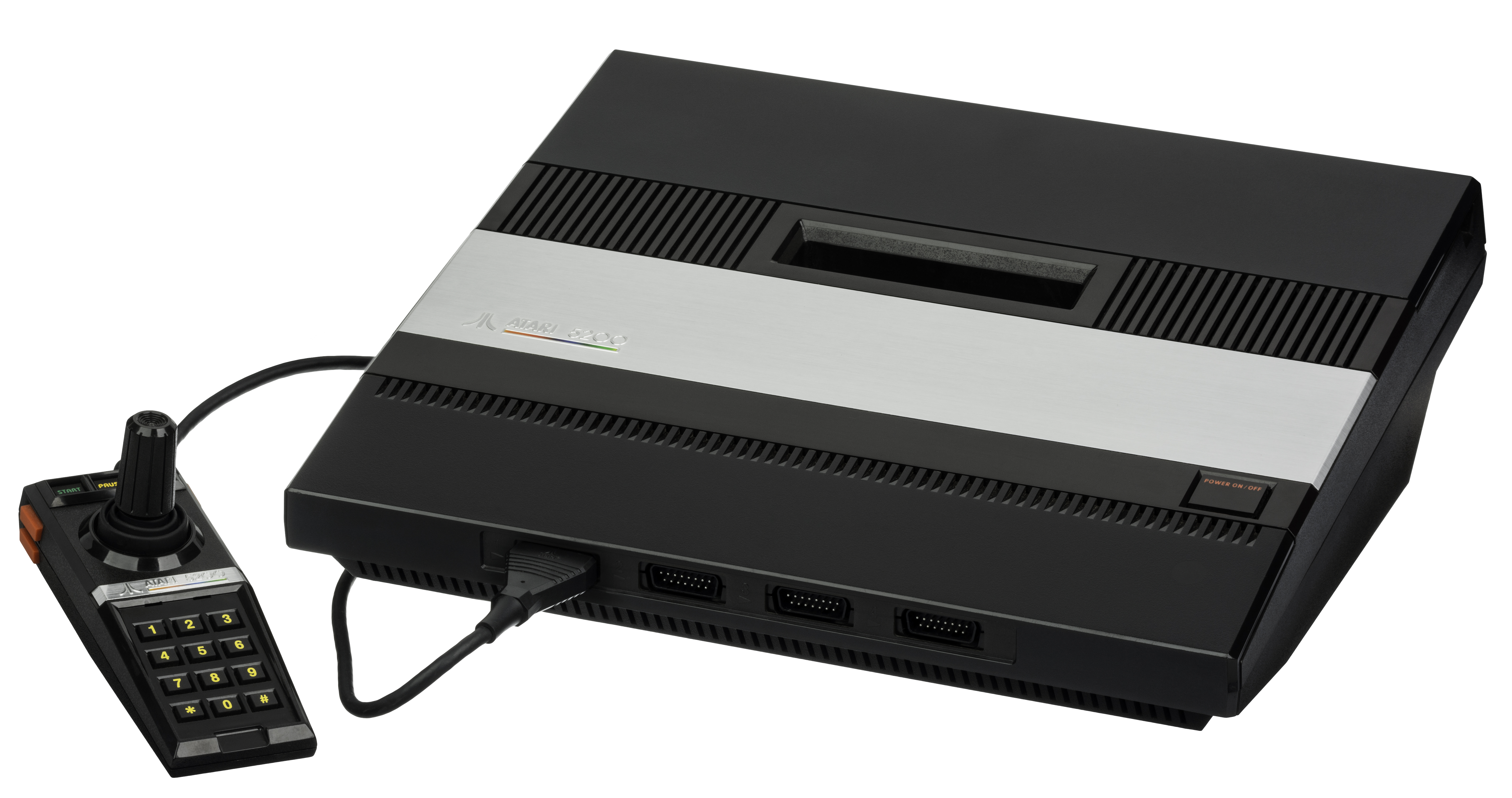
Atari 5200

Miner2049er was the first independently produced game released for the ColecoVision and the Atari 5200.

Artist Scott Ross was responsible for the cover art for Miner 2049er. Ross had not seen anything about the game, and based his illustration on recollections of how prospectors looked in films he had seen. Ross recalled that "there was no big discussion about what Bob looked like, and I'd no idea I'd draw the guy so many times in the future." Miner 2049er was first released for Atari computers in December 1982.

Creative Computing reported that plans were being finalized in October 1982 for a variety of other manufacturers to produce versions of Miner 2049er for popular home computers and video game systems. International Computer Group (ICG) handled the licensing of the game, with Hogue stating that "Just about every computer imaginable had a port." This mass-licensing and large advertising campaign by ICG, was described by William Cassidy of GameSpy as being new for the video game industry. Most game development company would design a game for one platform, then have its in-house programmers port the game to one or two other systems if it was successful. Kiren Hawken of Retro Gamer magazine said the game was released to a total of 22 different systems, including a LCD handheld game. In 1983, the game was released for various systems, including the Atari 2600 in May, the Atari 5200 in July, the Colecovision in August, the TI-99/4A in October, and the IBM PC in November. Miner 2049er was the first independently produced game released for the Atari 5200 and the ColecoVision. It was released for systems like the Super Cassette Vision and some of the major Japanese 8-bit computers of the 1980s, including the PC-8800 series, Fujitsuo FM-7, and the Sharp X1.

The Atari 8-bit computer version of the game sold well, with one review stating that it sold in similar quantities to the highly publicized Ultima II (1982). By 1983, Joaquin Boaz wrote in InfoWorld that Miner 2049er was "selling like crazy". Computer Entertainer reported that the ColecoVision version of the game by Micro Fun was the number-one-selling video game of the year. In an article published in Video magazine in January 1984, the game was described as "the most widely played home electronic game of all time", and the article also said that "no home-arcade title has had the impact" that the game had had to date. Livesay recalled the success of his ports of the game, saying that in "six months later I was making $15,000 a month in royalties, which was a huge amount for a single, 24-year-old kid in the early '80s." In a 2007 interview, Hogue reflected on the popularity of the game, saying that it was "a simple game and it's clear at first glance what needs to be done to finish a level. But as you're playing along you discover it wasn't quite as easy as you thought."

In the early 1990s, Hogue licensed Miner 2049er to Mindscape, which designed a version of the game for Game Boy. This version which featured scrolling versions of levels from both the 1982 game and its sequel Bounty Bob Strikes Back! (1985). Hogue recalled that the Game Boy version was "a really poor sales performer" and that "The developers weren't integrating with me on a daily basis; there was more of a 'We've done it, here it is,' approach."

In 2001, (Note: The first version of the emulator, published in 2001, contains the "20010720" timestamp on its "Help/About..." window.) Hogue released the game and its sequel, Bounty Bob Strikes Back!, for free online with an embedded Atari 8-bit computer emulator. Hogue said that he released it this way, as opposed to releasing the games' ROMs, as "I'd spent so much time back in the Eighties tweaking those color registers to achieve perfection and I wanted to see the game that way again."

Magmic released the game for mobile devices in 2007. The mobile version of the game features two versions of Miner 2049er: a new version with contemporary cartoon-style graphics of the game as well as a port of the original game, which was coded from scratch. Both versions feature gameplay similar to the original release. Both the Atari 800 and Atari 2600 versions of Miner2049er were included as part of the Atari 50 (2022) compilation for Nintendo Switch, PlayStation 4, Steam, and Xbox One.

== Reception ==
Reception

Review scores
Publication	Score
Arcade Express	Apple II: 10/10
Electronic Fun with Computers & Games	CV: 4/4
Electronic Games	Apple II: 10/10; A8bit: 10/10; C64: 8/10

Reviewers from computer publications including ANALOG Computing, Creative Computing InfoWorld, SoftSide and Softalk highlighted the games graphics. Tom Hudson of Analog Computing praised them as not simply being "just one-color graphics, but detailed multicolor objects" and that the gameplay was not abandoned in favor of them. Owen Linzmayer of Creative Computing found the game did not use the Atari computers full graphic potential, but the game included "one of the most dazzling visual effects" on the computer system, with the animation of Bounty Bob dematerializing on the elevators. Writing for SoftSide, David Plotkin also complimented the attention to detail, noting the animated moving feet on Bob and how his facial expression changes as he jumps. Boaz also discussed the color in the randomly generated palettes that were applied to levels, which he felt broke up monotony in the game.

For the gameplay, Deborah Burns of Antic and Boaz commented on the difficulty of the game, with Burns stating it was more difficult than it appears and Boaz saying the game to be a "gourmet's delight that offers many, many levels of challenge." Linzmayer echoed this, comparing the game to Donkey Kong, which had four stages, while Big Five Software's game had a "stupefying ten separate boards, each with a different scenario." In his review of the ColecoVision version of the game, George Kopp of Electronic Fun with Computers & Games "The struggle to get to the eleventh level is definitely worth it. The floating platforms here give the game all the grace and tension of a trapeze act in the Big Top." Hudson summarized that the game was "one of those rare games which looks as if it were designed, not just thrown together."

A reviewer credited as "MTY" in the magazine Softline found that despite being similar to Donkey Kong, Pac-Man, and Apple Panic (1981), the game was original and that "unlike many arcade games, [Miner2049er] doesn't require you to get faster as the pace picks up in order to attain the next level. It requires you to develop the different skills needed to survive." Harvey Kong Tin of Page 6 said that as jumping has become part of computer games with The Pharaoh's Curse (1983), Shamus: Case II (1983) and Jumpman (1983), Miner2049er ranked as the best of them. Margot Comstock Tommervik of Softalk (1983) concluded that the game "might recall other games; but no-rip-off here-the pieces come together in a way that's new and fresh, challenging and addictive; and delightful."

Reviewers like Plotkin and publications such as Computers & Electronics commented in their reviews that the game was set to become a classic, while Tommervik said it was "bound to be a hit." The Video Game Update listed Bill Hogue as the designer of the year in their 1983 awards listing. Scott Mace of InfoWorld listed it as the "best arcade-type computer game" of 1983, The game was awarded "1984 Electronic Game of the Year" at the 5th annual Arkie Awards by Video magazine. The game was included in various best of lists, such as the Electronic Fun with Computer & Games list of the 50 Best Video Games in 1984 and Nick Walker of Computer Gamer included the game in his list of 15 classic games for the Atari computer line, citing it as "The game that started the trend for jumping and climbing games and still one of the best."

Reviewing the VIC-20 version, The Video Game Update found the game "addictive" with graphics that were "less than outstanding", but said that "there are enough challenges in this game to keep the player busy for many, many hours of frustration and triumph." The magazine said the limitations of the Atari 2600 system meant that the graphics for that systems port were "sacrificed somewhat" and the game was "considerably slower and less fluid than in the original computer game, but this version is still a very good game in its own right." Reviewers in Games found the Atari 2600 version slower-paced than the original, and could not be compared to the "superb" ColecoVision version. Other ports were praised, such as Arnie Katz writing that "No previous Apple II game can match the fluidity of Miner's control scheme." concluding that the game was "new king of the computer climbing games." The Video Game Update also described the Intellivision version to be the "best climbing game yet" for the system.

For the Game Boy version, the two reviewers in Nintendo Power dismissed the game, with one saying it was poorly executed in terms of control, graphics and sound while the other said it was frustrating as the slightest miscalculation led to the players downfall.

=== Retrospective reception ===
Retrospective ratings

Review scores
Publication	Score
AllGame	4.5/5 (Atari 5200)
Computer and Video Games	82% (Colecovision)
IGN	8/10 (Mobile)
Pocket Gamer	2/5 (Mobile)

In retrospective reviews, Computer and Video Games gave the ColecoVision version an 82% rating in 1989, recommending it for fans of traditional platform games as one of the best on the system. Brett Alan Weiss reviewed the Atari 5200 version, declaring it "one of the best games of the early 1980s", noting that it was fast-paced, intricately designed, and a very long and diverse game. He said that unlike those in Donkey Kong, pathways were not immediately obvious, and this made the game fun and more challenging. In their "Hall of Fame" article on the game, William Cassidy of GameSpy referring to the game as "Hogue's masterwork." Cassidy praised the graphics and game play as high quality for 1983 standards, and that the games variety was the stand out feature as most arcade games of the era had one or two screens, Miner 2049er had ten different levels.

Levi Buchanan of IGN declared the mobile version to be "a pixel-perfect recreation of the original", finding the controls responsive for a mobile game. He found that the game was fun in 1984 and was also fun in 2007, and that the game merited a new audience. He recommended it for fans of games like Donkey Kong and BurgerTime (1982). The mobile version was later released for iOS. Mike Abolins of Pocket Gamer found the mobile version of the game to be slow-paced, writing that audiences who were familiar games like Sonic the Hedgehog and Super Mario Bros. would find the game slow-paced, and not conducive to repeated play. Richard Stanton, author of A Brief History of Video Games (2015), described that Miner 2049er was "forgotten" following the release of Nintendo's Super Mario Bros. (1985), a game that he described as making the 1982 game "look like a fossil".

== Legacy ==
Wonder if kids today think of Miner like we do. Miner returns us to a simpler time and perhaps that's why people like to play it again.

— Miner 2049er programmer Bill Hogue in 2007

Multiple games were directly influenced by Miner 2049er. Stanton said Miner 2049er contributed to the popularity of platform games on computers like the ZX Spectrum. This included Matthew Smith's Manic Miner (1983), one of the first major British hit computer games. Smith said that Hogue's game was a major influence on his game. Manic Miner borrows thematic and gameplay elements from Miner 2049er, such as the underground setting and oxygen levels measured with a timer.

Release timeline
1982	Miner 2049er
1983
1984	Miner 2049er II
1985	Bounty Bob Strikes Back!
1986–2006
2007	Miner 2049er (Mobile)

Following the games success, Hogue said that "The licensees of [Miner 2049er] were crying out for another game, so I worked with Curtis Mikolyski while we attempted to create an even better game." A follow-up titled Scraper Caper was announced in 1983 but never released. The game was going to have vertical scrolling and a plot involving Bounty Bob becoming a fire fighter, running into buildings to save people. Hogue said to have thrown away the disks and tapes containing Scraper Caper. He later said he felt foolish for the decision to cancel the game as a lot of work was put into it. Another unreleased follow-up was an untitled game. The game would have a three-dimension look influenced by Atari's game Crystal Castles (1983) and involved Bounty Bob being chased by fireballs. Hogue said the game production was halted as his team felt the design would not be superior to Miner 2049er.

Livesay was working on a game for Micro Fun titled Miner 2049er II, a title unrelated to Scraper Caper. The game was announced for released for the Apple II, Commodore 64, ColecoVision, and IBM PC. Hogue recalled the creation of this version was due to Micro Fun getting increasingly annoyed with Big Five Software as they had a verbal agreement to do an Apple II version of their next game. Hogue said that "It wasn't like I wasn't getting any money out of it, but creatively I wasn't totally on board. And I don't think I had an Apple II, so I didn't have a way to play it – or even see it." Miner 2049er II was released for the Apple II in the fourth quarter of 1984. The next game in the series was Bounty Bob Strikes Back! (1985). Hogue stated that following the video game crash of 1983 and the release of Bounty Bob Strikes Back!, Big Five Software started scaling back their company operations until it was run out of Hogue's home; he eventually closed the company and left the video game industry.
