= Galaxy Invasion =

1980 video game

- Publisher: Big Five Software
- Programmers: Bill Hogue; Jeff Konyu
- Platform: TRS-80
- Release: 1980
- Genre: Fixed shooter

Galaxy Invasion is a clone of Namco's Galaxian arcade game written by Big Five Software founders Bill Hogue and Jeff Konyu for the TRS-80 16K and published in 1980. It is the first game from Big Five to include sound and music. Galaxy Invasion was followed by an enhanced version in 1982, Galaxy Invasion Plus, which includes voice.

== Gameplay ==
Galaxy Invasion is a game of defending a solitary missile base from alien ships.

== Reception ==
Jon Mishcon reviewed Galaxy Invasion in The Space Gamer No. 35. Johnson commented that "this is one of those very rare state-of-the-art game programs. A wonderful program. A better than wonderful game. Buy it immediately."
