= Who-Dun-It? =

1979 video game

- Developer(s): Instant Software
- Publisher(s): Instant Software
- Platform(s): TRS-80
- Release: 1979

Who-Dun-It? is a 1979 video game published by Instant Software for the TRS-80 16K. It is named for the whodunit, a type of crime fiction.

== Contents ==
Who-Dun-It? is a game in which the player chooses one of five crimes to investigate.

== Reception ==
Bruce Campbell reviewed Who-Dun-It? in The Space Gamer No. 40. Campbell commented that "I only recommend Who-Dun-It? to those who enjoy mysteries or logic problems. If you fit those categories, it may well be worth the relatively low price."
