= Airmail Pilot =

1979 video game

- Developer(s): Instant Software
- Publisher(s): Instant Software
- Platform(s): TRS-80, TI-99/4A
- Release: WW: 1979
- Genre(s): Flight simulator

Airmail Pilot is a video game published in 1979 by Instant Software, in which the player pilots a Curtiss JN-4D "Jenny" biplane carrying mail from Columbus, Ohio to Chicago.

== Gameplay ==
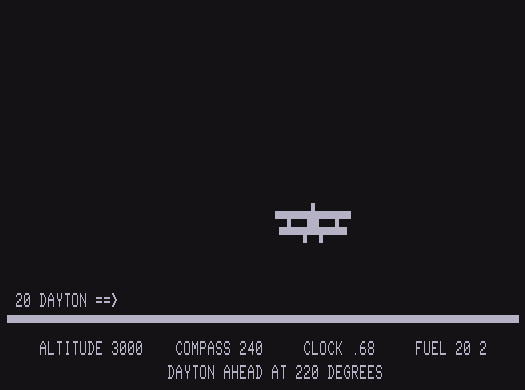
The simple flight simulation of Airmail Pilot

The game begins with an advertisement attributed to an 18 July 1922 issue of the Chicago Sun which reads: "Wanted: Airmail pilot for the Columbus to Chicago run. Must be willing to fly in every type of weather. Only the foolhardy need apply." The player pilots a Curtiss JN-4D "Jenny" biplane carrying mail from Columbus, Ohio to Chicago, via Dayton, Indianapolis, and Logansport.

== Reception ==
Bruce Campbell reviewed Airmail Pilot in The Space Gamer No. 36. Campbell commented that "If you are looking for a realistic airflight simulation, Airmail Pilot is not for you. Since its price is on the lower end of the software spectrum, I do recommend it for those looking for a quick, easy, enjoyable game with limited staying power." Another reviewer from Moves commented, "It can be fun and amusing, but it is not designed to hold an adult's attention for very long."

== Reviews ==
- Review in Kilobaud Microcomputing
