= Jovian (video game) =

1982 adventure video game

Jovia
- Developers: Bill Dunlevy & Douglas Frayer
- Publisher: Computer Shack
- Platform: TRS-80
- Release: 1982
- Genre: Adventure

Jovian is a 1982 video game published by Computer Shack.

== Gameplay ==
Jovian is a game in which the player maneuvers carefully to avoid objects in space to make an attack against an enemy space station.

== Reception ==
Dick McGrath reviewed the game for Computer Gaming World, and stated that "The game is definitely challenging and can become addictive I rate it a solid 8 out of 10."
