= Mad Mines =

1982 video game

- Developer: Funsoft
- Publisher: Funsoft
- Designer: Yves Lempereur
- Platform: TRS-80
- Release: 1982
- Genre: Fixed shooter

Mad Mines is a fixed shooter video game written for the TRS-80 by Yves Lempereur and published by Funsoft in 1982.

== Gameplay ==
Mad Mines is a game in which space mines float above a protective force field and the player uses a cannon to shoot them.

== Reception ==
Dick McGrath reviewed the game for Computer Gaming World, and stated that "The originality is pretty low here, so Mad Mines [...] gets a 4 [out of 10]." In a review of six TRS-80 games for Creative Computing, Owen Linzmayer was more impressed:

Mad Mines is one of the most professional arcade games available. It is constantly challenging because it requires both dexterity and strategy. I have a special bunch of games that I keep on-hand to show off to friends–Mad Mines has earned its place in that limited group.

Linzmayer described Mad Mines as a combination of the Apple II games Space Eggs and Ceiling Zero.
