= Monster Mash & Battleship =

1980 video game

- Publisher(s): Micro-80 Inc.
- Platform(s): TRS-80
- Release: 1980

Monster Mash & Battleship is a 1980 video game published by Micro-80 Inc. for the TRS-80 16K.

== Contents ==
Monster Mash & Battleship is two games, Monster Mash in which the monster chases the player in an open maze, and Battleship in which the player plays against the computer and each try to sink the other's ships.

== Reception ==
Jon Mishcon reviewed Monster Mash & Battleship in The Space Gamer No. 41. Mishcon commented that "All in all, this is a very good buy for kids. The games are simple and well done. However, serious gamers will quickly find these games monotonous."
