= Space Ace 21 =

1981 video game

- Publisher: Synergistic Solar, Inc.
- Platform: TRS-80
- Release: WW: 1981
- Genres: Space flight simulator, shoot 'em up
- Modes: Single-player, multiplayer

Space Ace 21 is a video game published by Synergistic Solar, Inc.

== Development ==
Space Ace 21 is a game involving combat between two spaceships, played in either two or three dimensions.

== Gameplay ==
Space Ace 21 is a game where players construct modular spacecraft from a set of modules and test the design in simulated realistic physics based 3d or 2d stop action combat

== Reception ==
Ian Chadwick reviewed Space Ace 21 in Ares Magazine #13 and commented that "Space Ace 21 is highly recommended for the science fiction game buff tired of arcade shootouts and looking for a more realistic bit of fun."
