= Attack Force (video game) =

1980 video game

- Developer: Big Five Software
- Publisher: Big Five Software
- Designers: Bill Hogue; Jeff Konyu
- Platform: TRS-80
- Release: WW: 1980
- Genre: Shoot 'em up

Attack Force is a shoot 'em up video game for the TRS-80 16K published in 1980 by Big Five Software. It was developed by Big Five co-founders Bill Hogue and Jeff Konyu. Attack Force is based on Exidy's 1980 Targ arcade video game.

== Gameplay ==
Attack Force is a game in which the player's ship must avoid the twisting and turning ram-ships of the enemy.

== Reception ==
J. Mishcon reviewed Attack Force in The Space Gamer No. 39. Mishcon commented that "This is another strong entry in the Big Five line and I strongly recommend it for any arcade buff."
