= Voyage of the Valkyrie =

1981 video game

- Publishers: Advanced Operating Systems; Sams
- Designer: Leo Christopherson
- Platforms: Apple II, TRS-80
- Release: 1981

Voyage of the Valkyrie is a video game for the TRS-80 and Apple II published in 1981 by Advanced Operating Systems. It was written by Leo Christopherson.

== Gameplay ==
Voyage of the Valkyrie is a game in which the player pilots the ship Valkyrie attempting to defeat the ten castles on the island of Fugloy.

== Reception ==
Forrest Johnson reviewed Voyage of the Valkyrie in The Space Gamer No. 48. Johnson commented that "Voyage of the Valkyrie is a novel arcade game, more valuable to TRS-80 users than those who game on the Apple."
