= Computer Foreign Exchange =

1982 video game

- Developer: Avalon Hill
- Publisher: Avalon Hill
- Platform: TRS-80
- Release: 1982

Computer Foreign Exchange is a 1982 video game published by Avalon Hill.

== Gameplay ==
Computer Foreign Exchange is a game in which the player acts on behalf of an American company with international assets trying to accumulate money the fastest.

== Reception ==
Bob Proctor reviewed the game for Computer Gaming World, and stated that "this is a decent game and a good program provided you have someone to play with. The price is right and it only takes 16K!"
