= Invasion Force =

1979 video game

- Developer: Tandy Corporation
- Publisher: Tandy Corporation
- Platform: TRS-80
- Release: 1979
- Genres: Action, strategy

Invasion Force is a science fiction action video game produced by the Tandy Corporation in June, 1979. Invasion Force was a text-based game played real-time in the style of other Star Trek games.

== Gameplay ==
The player is in control of the USS Hephaestus and must make decisions to manage resources, such as fuel and ammunition, so the ship does not become stranded in space while fending off attacks from the Jovians. The game has 10 difficulty levels.

== Reception ==
Glenn Mai reviewed Invasion Force in The Space Gamer No. 36. Mai commented that "If you don't have a Star Trek game and want one, get Invasion Force."
