= Money Madness (video game) =

1980 video game

- Publisher: Instant Software
- Platform: TRS-80
- Release: 1980

Money Madness is a 1980 video game published by Instant Software for the TRS-80.

== Contents ==
Money Madness is a package containing two game programs, Millionaire and Timber Baron.

== Reception ==
Bruce Campbell reviewed Money Madness in The Space Gamer No. 39. Campbell commented that "For those interested in a business simulation, I recommend this package. Many single programs cost more. While Timber Baron is of primary interest, you may also enjoy a few games of Millionaire."
