= Lunar Rescue =

1979 video game

- Developer: Taito
- Publisher: Taito
- Platform: Arcade
- Release: JP: November 1979; NA: May 1980
- Genre: Shoot 'em up
- Modes: Single-player, multiplayer
- Arcade system: Taito 8080

Lunar Rescue (Note: Japanese: ルーナー・ レスキユー, Hepburn: Runā Resukyū) is a 1979 shoot 'em up video game developed and published by Taito for arcades. It was released in Japan in November 1979 and North America in May 1980. Alongside Space Cyclone (1980), it was developed as a follow-up to Space Invaders (1978) by its designer Tomohiro Nishikado and his team, to which it is a spin-off of, but was relatively unsuccessful compared to its predecessor.

== Gameplay ==
The player's ship (red) above a 150-point landing site

The game starts with the player's spacecraft docked inside the mothership at the top of the screen. Below the mothership is an asteroid field and below that, the surface of the moon. There are three platforms which can be landed on and six stranded astronauts that need rescuing. The player must press the button to release their spacecraft from the mothership and manoeuvre through the asteroid field. The craft can only move left or right or use up a finite amount of fuel by engaging the thrust (the same button again) to slow its descent. If the craft is landed successfully on one of the available platforms, one of the astronauts will run towards and board the craft.

The asteroid belt now changes into a swarm of flying saucers, some of which drop bombs. The player must now guide the spacecraft back up to the mothership (the craft ascends without using up fuel), avoiding the flying saucers. The thrust button is now a fire button which can be used to shoot at enemies above (as in Space Invaders). Finally, the craft must be docked with the mothership using the bay opening. If the side of the mothership or any part of the ship outside of the opening is hit, the rescued astronaut falls to the surface and dies. If the mothership is missed altogether, the craft explodes. After all six people have been rescued (or killed provided the player still has lives remaining), the game starts again at a higher level. Some ascent stages will have comets flying diagonally -- the comets follow one of two consistent paths forming an X across the screen, so planning can help in dodging them. When you pick up an astronaut (regardless of comets or enemy ships), the platform level where you landed disappears.

== Legacy ==
A number of clones co-opted the original title such as versions released by CRL Group and Lyversoft for the ZX Spectrum, and Alligata for the Acorn Electron and BBC Micro. Clones with different titles include Meteor Mission (Acornsoft) for the BBC Micro, Meteor Mission II (Big Five Software) for the TRS-80, and Broderbund's Stellar Shuttle for the Atari 8-bit computers.

Lunar Rescue is included in the compilation Taito Legends 2 for PlayStation 2, Xbox, and Microsoft Windows.

It was released as part of Space Invaders Invincible Collection.
