= Reign of the Red Dragon =

1982 video game

- Publisher(s): Adventure International
- Designer(s): Dave Daring
- Platform(s): TRS-80
- Release: NA: 1982
- Genre(s): RPG

Reign of the Red Dragon is video game written by David Daring for the TRS-80 and published by Adventure International in 1982.

== Gameplay ==
Reign of the Red Dragon is a game in which up to five adventurers enter a castle to recover the eight pieces of an ancient scepter, after which the red dragon will attack.

== Reception ==
Bruce Campbell reviewed Reign of the Red Dragon in Space Gamer No. 66. Campbell commented that "If you enjoy this type of program, I recommend Reign of the Red Dragon as superior to some similar programs available in this price range."

In the October 1982 issue of 80-U.S. Journal, David Tinis categorized the game as having similarities to Hellfire Warrior and concluded, "The graphics are well done and even though there is no sound, the game is very enjoyable. I would recommend it highly to anyone who enjoys a good adventure."
