= Instant Software =

Instant Software, Inc., was a company that produced game, utility, and education software active from 1978 to 1985. It primarily developed software for the TRS-80 line of home computers. Instant Software was a subsidiary of Kilobaud Microcomputing, headquartered in Peterborough, New Hampshire and run by Wayne Green.

== History ==
Green said in 1980 that although his company Instant Software had published "hundreds of programs for the TRS-80 [and] want to translate as many as possible for use on the TI-99/4", it could not find anyone among more than 1,000 developers in its network who could port software to the computer, adding "We understand the problems with the system and the efforts Texas Instruments made to make translation difficult".

== Games ==
- Santa Paravia en Fiumaccio (1978)
- Casino II - Craps (1978)
- Dungeon of Death (1979)
- Who-Dun-It? (1979)
- Wordwatch (1979)
- Airmail Pilot (1980)
- Cosmic Patrol (1980)
- Money Madness (1980)
- Danger in Orbit (1981)
- Master Reversi (1981)
