= Super Nova (video game) =

1980 video game

- Publisher: Big Five Software
- Programmers: Bill Hogue; Jeff Konyu
- Platform: TRS-80
- Release: 1980
- Genre: Multidirectional shooter
- Mode: Single-player

Super Nova is clone of Atari, Inc.'s Asteroids arcade game published by Big Five Software for the TRS-80 in 1980. Co-author Bill Hogue called Super Nova "the game that started the company."

== Gameplay ==
Super Nova is a game in which the player uses missiles to blow asteroids into smaller chunks, and then split them into smaller hunks which can then be completely destroyed.

== Reception ==
Jon Mishcon reviewed Super Nova in The Space Gamer No. 36. Mishcon commented that "I found this game to be a real challenge. Recommended for any arcade buff." In the video game magazine Moves (#57), Ian Chadwick described Super Nova as "exciting", though criticized the lack of sound effects.
