= Parsector V =

1980 video game

- Publisher: Synergistic Solar
- Platform: TRS-80
- Release: 1980

Parsector V is a 1980 video game published by Synergistic Solar for the TRS-80.

== Gameplay ==
Parsector V is a game on a split screen in which each player maneuvers on one board while trying to deduce the moves of their opponent. Each player (or the computer, in a single-player game), controls a Mothership used to capture "parsectors" of the galaxy. A Mothership can launch smaller ships: fyters, cruzers, and bases, as well as engaging with its own weapons.

== Reception ==
J. Mishcon reviewed Parsector V in The Space Gamer No. 38. Mishcon commented that "This is worth a try for all those who enjoy complex games with the 'fog of war.'" In a 1982 review for SoftSide, Martin Lewis concluded, "Rated a 10, this is indeed an excellent value."
