= Micro-80 Pinball Machine =

1980 video game

- Publisher: Micro-80 Inc.
- Designer: Garth Jensen
- Platform: TRS-80
- Release: 1980

Micro-80 Pinball Machine is a 1980 video game published by Micro-80 Inc. for the TRS-80 16K. It was also published as a type-in BASIC listing in the July 1980 issue of SoftSide.

== Contents ==
Micro-80 Pinball Machine is a pinball game that makes use of multiple different scenarios.

== Reception ==
Jon Mishcon reviewed Micro-80 Pinball Machine in The Space Gamer No. 40. Mishcon commented that "Overall, I'd say this is a good buy for kids. For the serious video/pinball fan forget it."
