= Frenzy (1982 video game) =

1982 video game

- North American arcade flyer
- Developer: Stern Electronics
- Publisher: Stern Electronics
- Designer: Alan McNeil
- Platforms: Arcade, ColecoVision, ZX Spectrum, Atari 7800
- Release: May 1982: Arcade; NA: May 1982 ColecoVision; EU: 1983; NA: February 1984 ZX Spectrum; UK: 1983 7800; WW: December 5, 2024
- Genres: Maze, multidirectional shooter
- Modes: Single-player, multiplayer

Frenzy is a 1982 maze multidirectional shooter video game developed and published by Stern Electronics for arcades. It is a direct sequel to Berzerk (1980); both games were designed by Alan McNeil. Frenzy's gameplay is very similar to Berzerk—the player enters a series of maze-like rooms containing armed robots and must shoot them to survive—but adds more variety. Ports were released for ColecoVision and ZX Spectrum.

In 2024, Atari re-released Robert DeCrescenzo's homebrew port of Frenzy as an official Atari 7800 release, as part of Atari's 2600+ and 7800+ platforms.

== Gameplay ==
The player (green) is in the power plant room along with many blue robots.

The player must navigate a maze full of hostile robots. The goal of the game is to survive as long as possible and score points by killing robots and travelling from room to room. The game has no end other than the player losing all of their lives.

The player has a gun to shoot the robots and the low intelligence of the robots means that they can often be tricked into shooting each other. If the player lingers too long in a room, a bouncing smiley face (known as "Evil Otto") appears, and relentlessly chases the player. Evil Otto will destroy any robots in his way and can move through walls.

== Differences from Berzerk ==
In Berzerk, the walls are all electrified and kill the player on contact. In Frenzy, some of the walls of the maze are composed of "dots" which can be shot. This opens up strategies such as blasting a hole in the side of a room and using it to escape when in trouble. The solid walls, on the other hand, now reflect shots. The player can trick robots into killing themselves by standing on the opposite side of a reflective wall and letting them shoot it. The only wall that simply absorbs shots harmlessly like in the original is the closed door that appears behind the player when they enter a new room.

Neither type of wall is electrified in Frenzy, allowing the player to touch them without dying. The robots in Frenzy no longer kill the player on contact, but now create small explosions when shot which can kill the player. It is no longer possible to kill robots by tricking them into walking into the now-harmless walls. There are two types of robots: skeletons and tanks. The two types have identical behavior, but the skeletons are more difficult to shoot from above or below due to the thinness of their sprite.

In Berzerk, Evil Otto was indestructible. In Frenzy, shooting him once changes him from a smiley face to a "neutral" face, and another shot converts him to a "frowny" face. One more shot kills him. However, each time Evil Otto is killed it makes him a little bit faster the next time he appears, which is usually immediately.

Every four mazes features interactive, decorative elements that were not present in Berzerk. In one room is a huge statue of Evil Otto, for example. Each one has a specific effect on gameplay for that one room. The order is: Big Otto, Power Plant, Central Computer, and Robot Factory. The Power Plant and the Central Computer are surrounded by walls made entirely of "dots", while Big Otto and the Robot Factory are surrounded by reflective walls with only one breakable "dot" in the corner, making them more difficult to hit.

In the Power Plant room, shooting the power plant once will disable it, and all robots in the room will stop moving. In the Central Computer room, shooting the computer will cause all the robots to start moving and firing erratically. The Robot Factory will continue to spit out additional robots while the player remains in the stage, taunting as it does so. Shooting the factory normally has no effect, although, in the Coleco port, shooting the factory will disable it and stop the endless stream of robots.

In the Big Otto room, if the player kills Evil Otto, not only does he immediately respawn as usual, but the Big Otto sends four more Ottos onto the screen, all moving at top speed. Like the Robot Factory, shooting Big Otto has no effect. Big Otto starts out with closed eyes and a neutral expression, but kill all of the robots in the room, and his face turns into a slight frown (only in the Coleco port). When Evil Otto is killed, his expression changes to one of rage, with glowing red eyes and a frowning mouth. He also smiles when the player dies, though his eyes remain the same as before, either closed or open.

Finally, the robots in Frenzy are less talkative than those in Berzerk, only speaking in a few specific situations. They say "Robot attack!" when Evil Otto appears, "Charge attack shoot kill destroy" when the player kills Otto, "The humanoid must not destroy the robot" when entering the Big Otto room, "The humanoid..." when shooting the Central Computer, and the dialogue randomly alternates between "A robot must get the humanoid" and "A robot, not a chicken" when the Robot Factory dispenses a new robot.

== Reception ==
In a 1982 review, Electronic Games magazine wrote, "Frenzy passes all the requirements for a good follow-up arcade machine." Computer Entertainer reviewed the ColecoVision port positively in February 1984, calling it "one of those addictive games that's hard to put away" and praising the graphics and gameplay.

== Legacy ==
In 2013, a conversion of the game for the Atari 7800 was created by Bob DeCrescenzo with assistance from original Frenzy developer Alan McNeil, and sold through AtariAge.

On March 16, 2023, Atari announced that it had acquired the intellectual property rights to 12 Stern Electronics titles, including Berzerk and Frenzy.
