= Pork Barrel (video game) =

1979 video game

- Developer: George Blank
- Publisher: Ramware
- Platform: TRS-80
- Release: 1979
- Genre: Government simulation game

Pork Barrel is a 1979 video game developed by George Blank and published by Ramware for the TRS-80.

== Contents ==
Pork Barrel is a game about passing bills to win an election.

== Reception ==
Jon Mishcon reviewed Pork Barrel in The Space Gamer No. 42. Mishcon commented that "If you can find people who'll pretend to be politicians with conscience, this game is fine. If you play to win, look elsewhere."
