= Big Five Software =

- Industry: Video games
- Founded: 1980
- Headquarters: Van Nuys, California, US
- Key people: Bill Hogue; Jeff Konyu
- Products: Miner 2049er Bounty Bob Strikes Back!
- Website: bigfivesoftware.com at the Wayback Machine (archived 14 September 2019)

Big Five Software was an American video game developer and publisher in the first half of the 1980s founded by Bill Hogue and Jeff Konyu. The company developed games for the TRS-80 and Atari 8-bit computers. Most of its TRS-80 games were clones of arcade video games, such as Galaxy Invasion (Galaxian), Super Nova (Asteroids), Defense Command (Missile Command), and Meteor Mission II (Lunar Rescue). Big Five also sold an Atari joystick interface called TRISSTICK which was popular with TRS-80 owners.

The company's biggest release came after moving away from the black and white TRS-80. Miner 2049er, a ten stage platform game, was designed and programmed by Bill Hogue for Atari 8-bit computers. Shipped on a custom 16 kilobyte ROM cartridge (compared to standard 8 KB Atari 8-bit cartridges), the game was a commercial and critical success and was ported to other computers and consoles. Miner 2049er was awarded "Electronic Game of the Year" in the 1984 Arkie Awards, among other accolades for the game and Hogue.

A sequel, Bounty Bob Strikes Back! was published in 1985 after an earlier attempt at a spin-off starring Bounty Bob, Scraper Caper, was cancelled. After Bounty Bob Strikes Back, Hogue stopped developing games and Big Five ramped down. In 2001, (Note: The first version of the emulator, published in 2001, contains the "20010720" timestamp on its "Help/About..." window.) he released a free, custom emulation of the Atari 8-bit versions of Miner 2049er and Bounty Bob Strikes Back! for Microsoft Windows.

== Games ==
=== TRS-80 ===
- Attack Force (1980)
- Cosmic Fighter (1980)
- Galaxy Invasion (1980)
- Meteor Mission II (1980)
- Galaxy Invasion Plus (1980)
- Super Nova (1980)
- Robot Attack (1981)
- Stellar Escort (1981)
- Defense Command (1982)
- Weerd (1982)

=== Atari 8-bit ===
- Miner 2049er (1982)
- Bounty Bob Strikes Back! (1985)

=== Unreleased ===
- Meteor Mission (1980)
- Scraper Caper (Atari 8-bit, circa 1983). It was mentioned in some magazine ads for Miner 2049er.
