= Star Cruiser (1980 video game) =

1980 video game

- Developer: Strategems Co.
- Platform: TRS-80
- Release: 1980

Star Cruiser is a 1980 video game by Strategems Co. for the TRS-80 Model I Level II.

== Plot summary ==
Star Cruiser is a game where two hostile solar systems must either try to force 25 other planets become their allies, or destroy all six starships of their enemy.

== Reception ==
J. Mishcon reviewed Star Cruiser in The Space Gamer No. 30. Mishcon commented that "A nice try, but the execution is so poor that it will bring to mind all the rip-of wargames moldering in your closet. Why not wait till someone does this properly?"
