= Pinball (1980 video game) =

- Publisher: Acorn Software Products
- Designer: John Allen
- Platform: TRS-80
- Release: 1980
- Genre: Pinball

Pinball is a pinball simulation written by John Allen and published by Acorn Software Products in 1980 for the TRS-80.

== Gameplay ==
Gameplay screenshot

Pinball is a game which gives variable speed of the ball as well as variable power of the ball release.

The game has five speed settings, and is played using five balls per game, with up to four players. The game can be controlled with two joysticks, and nudging is possible. Players can earn free balls by reaching certain score targets.

The scores and high score of the current session are shown on the right of the display.

The configuration of the board can be edited, and saved for future use.

== Development ==
Instructions are loaded directly into video memory so the "board" is drawn before the program completes loading.

== Reception ==
Jon Mishcon reviewed Pinball in The Space Gamer No. 36. Mishcon commented that "As a program, a strong endorsement, as a game, a qualified yes."

In another review, ball travel was found to be natural and the sound to be adequate.
