= Berzerk (video game) =

1980 video game

- Arcade flyer
- Developer: Stern Electronics
- Publisher: Stern Electronics
- Designer: Alan McNeil
- Platforms: Arcade, Atari 2600, Vectrex, Atari 5200, Atari 7800
- Release: November 1980: Arcade; November 1980; Atari 2600; August 1982; Vectrex; October 1982; Atari 5200; February 1984; Atari 7800; 2024
- Genres: Maze, shooter
- Modes: Single-player, multiplayer

Berzerk is a 1980 maze and shooter video game developed and published by Stern Electronics for arcades. The game involves a Humanoid Intruder who has to escape maze-like rooms that are littered with robots which slowly move toward and shoot at the Humanoid. The player can shoot at the robots to try to escape the room. Along with the robots, a smiley face known as Evil Otto appears to hunt down the player within each room.

The first game to be developed in-house at Stern, Berzerk was designed by programmer Alan McNeil. He slowly developed a game with robots at first, and then later added the walls and the Evil Otto character to expand on the gameplay. After the company was visited by a salesperson promoting a "speech chip", McNeil took the offer and incorporated digitized voices that taunt the player during gameplay and attract mode. Following Stratovox (1980), it was one of the earliest games to use speech synthesis.

Stern premiered the game at the Amusement & Music Operators Association (AMOA) exposition in Chicago in late 1980. It was released shortly thereafter, and sold around 15,000 units. Conversions to the Atari 2600 and Vectrex home consoles were released in 1982, followed by the Atari 5200 in 1984. They were generally received well by the video game press. The Atari 2600 version received a Certificate of Merit award for "Best Solitaire Videogame" from Electronic Games.

McNeil developed a 1982 sequel, Frenzy, with more variety. Berzerk directly influenced Robotron: 2084 (1982). The game appeared on various "best of" lists and articles from publications like Flux in 1995, GameSpy in 2002, and Retro Gamer in 2008.

== Gameplay ==
A screenshot of the arcade version of the game, where the green Humanoid enters a room with five red robots

Berzerk is described as both a maze and shooter game. The goal of Berzerk is to shoot as many robots as possible and escape a maze-like room. At the start of each room, the Humanoid appears in the middle of one of the four edges and can escape through the exits on a different side of the area.

The rooms are littered with robots that move slowly and occasionally shoot at the player. The robots can fire in eight directions. The player shoots in one of the eight directions the joystick is moved towards. The joystick also controls the Humanoid Intruder's movement. The player cannot move while firing. Bonus points are awarded when the robots in all of the rooms are destroyed. A smiley face known as "Evil Otto" will eventually come into the room from where the Humanoid entered and cannot be destroyed. Evil Otto can move through walls and follows the Humanoid Intruder while trying to defeat it. Being shot by the robots, touching a maze wall, or coming into contact with either Evil Otto or a robot will result in the player losing a life.

DIP switches are available in the arcade machine for the operator to adjust some gameplay elements. This provides options to allow the player to receive an extra life at 5,000 points, 10,000 points or not at all. By 1981, two models of Berzerk existed. The first featured three different colored robots, with the yellow robots that do not shoot bullets, red robots that shoot one shot at a time, and white robots that shoot two shots at a time. The next model featured all the previous robots, as well as purple robots that shoot three or five shots at a time, yellow robots that shoot four shots at a time, and a white robot that shoots one very fast shot.

== Development ==
Alan McNeil developed Berzerk for Universal Research Laboratories, a video game developer acquired by Stern Electronics in 1977. McNeil enjoyed games like Stratego and Mille Bornes when he was younger. He became interested in network-based video games through the PLATO computer system. After college, he made some games on his Sol-20 computer, like an adaptation of Chase, a game that originated on the Dartmouth Time-Sharing System which later appeared as a type-in listing in Creative Computing, Kilobaud Microcomputing, Dr. Dobb's Journal and David Ahl's book More BASIC Computer Games. How McNeil encountered Chase is unclear: while he remembered seeing the game in Byte, it never appeared as a type-in listing in that publication. McNeil found work at Dave Nutting Associates, where he programmed the coin-op sequels Boot Hill and Sea Wolf II and ported Gun Fight to the Bally Professional Arcade. Tired of working on ports and sequels, McNeil requested permission to create an original video game, but management refused to let him, citing his lack of game design experience. This resulted in McNeil seeking work outside the company.

McNeil found new work at Stern Electronics in 1979 with the promise that, after he fixed a problem on a Bally controller board, he could develop a video game. Stern was starting to get involved in video games, which led to McNeil doing the artwork, graphics design, programming and debugging of the game himself. He quickly developed a prototype of the game on his Tektronix development system. The first prototype was influenced by Chase. It had the theme of robots attempting to kill the player and the robots vanishing if they crashed into each other. He used Fred Saberhagen's series Berserker for the title of the game, as the novels are about robot war machines that are out to kill all biological life forms. He said in an interview that developing the concept for the game was simple, but described actually making the game as "drudge work".

McNeil wanted the average game to last about three minutes for a novice player. In his initial version, McNeil said he made the robots move too quickly, which caused the game to become "too hard, even with just six robots; the game favored the robots too much - they would crash into each other occasionally, but the average game time on one life was about six seconds - not good." He tweaked the robots' speeds and adjusted the number of bullets they could shoot as the player entered a new room. The walls in the rooms were initially not entirely random, which McNeil felt was not immersive. He altered the game so that rooms had a seed generator based on certain x and y co-ordinates within the code.

To incentivize a player to leave a room once the robots were defeated, McNeil created the "Evil Otto" character, a bouncing happy face. McNeil stated that he despised the happy-face icon and believed its associated phrase, "Have a nice day", was used by "people who didn't want you to have a nice day, but instead wanted to cover themselves in fake righteousness. So I showed it like it was: 'have a nice day while I beat you to death!'". He named the character after Dave Nutting Associates office manager Dave Otto, who enacted several office policies that annoyed the engineers.

During the game, the enemy robots speak audible threats, warnings, and insults whether a player fights or flees the room. McNeil said that the game originally had what he described as "pinball-type sounds", but this was changed when a salesman visited during development. The salesman was selling a "speech chip"; the chip was intended to assist people with visual impairments, but the company was trying to expand into toys and games, and, upon finding that the voice sounded very robotic, McNeil used it for Berzerk. The speech chip used custom hardware to make hisses and tones which could be assembled into words. McNeil kept the phrases short and applied them to the game to taunt players. He also included phrases for attract mode.

The last major addition was in the final month of production: making the game in color instead of black and white. As a black and white game, Berzerk was originally designed with translucent ink applied to the monitor screen to make it appear to be in color. To make the game truly colored, company engineers created a four-bit color overlay video layer.

== Release ==
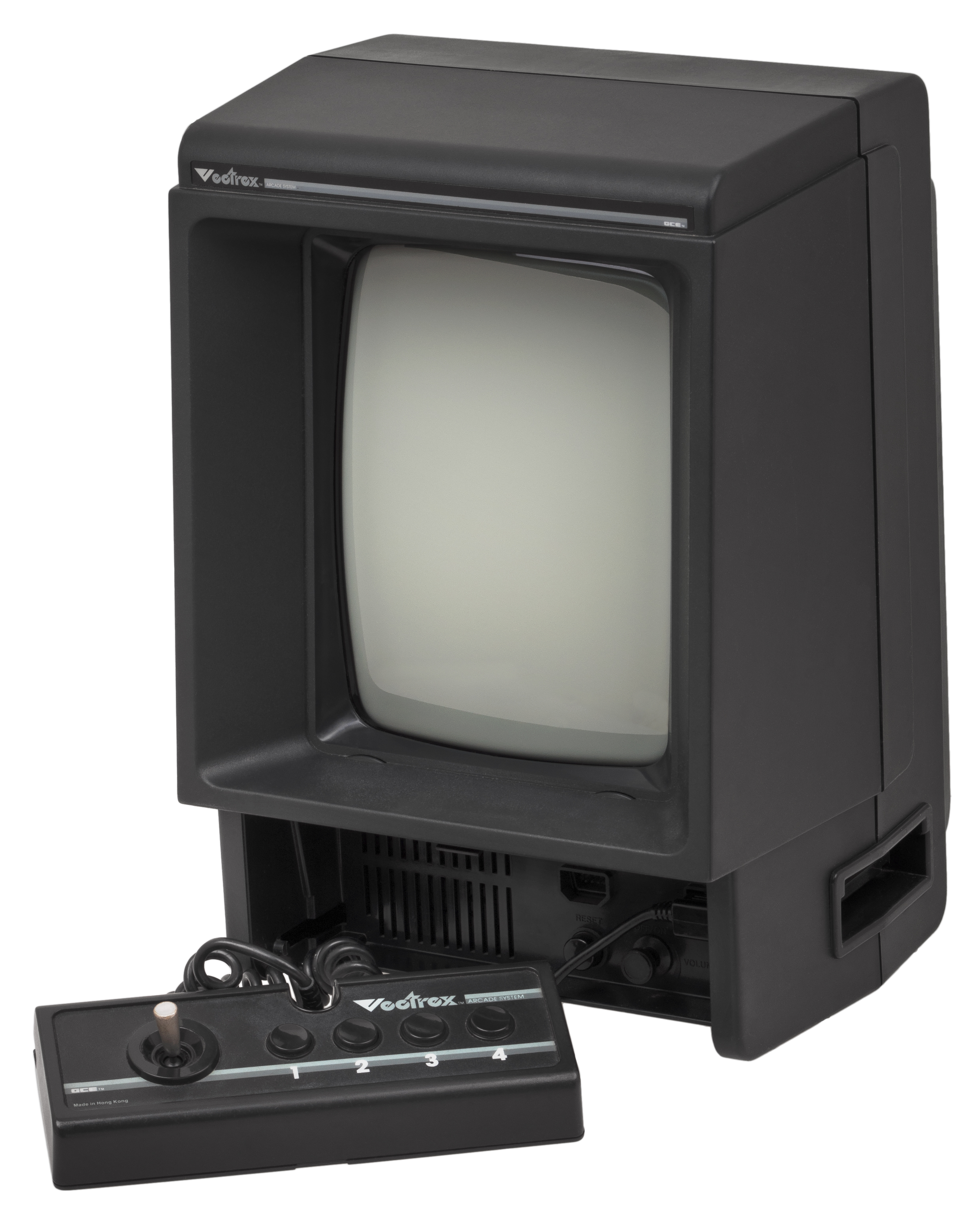
Berzerk was one of the titles available for the Vectrex video game system on its launch in October 1982.

Stern revealed the game at the Amusement & Music Operators Association (AMOA) exposition in Chicago which ran between October 31 and November 2, 1980. The show had a total attendance of 7,400 visitors. Cashbox reported that the show visitors would crowd into Berzerk's booth daily for a chance to play it. Early test models for Berzerk had large joysticks, which had to be replaced by standard one-inch-high models created by the Wico Corporation. McNeil said they changed the joysticks because players were pulling down so hard on them, that the cabinet would tip onto them.

Berzerk began shipping in November 1980, and Stern manufactured and sold around 15,000 units, which was a "sizable hit" for them. McNeil commented that "some games would be played out in a month because kids would get easily bored with them, but they always came back to Berzerk. Pac-Man eventually spelled the end of Berzerk's dominance, but even then it was earning well for operators."

The success of Berzerk in arcades led to versions made for Atari consoles and the Vectrex. Berzerk was released for the Atari 2600 in August 1982, the Vectrex in October 1982, and the Atari 5200 in February 1984. The port for the Atari 2600 was developed by Dan Hitchens. McNeil disliked the ports because he thought the games looked cruder than the arcade original, and responded that "Stern Electronics had sold the rights to make the home game to Atari for 4 million dollars - intellectual property capitalism at its finest."

Berzerk was re-released as downloadable content in 2024 for the Atari 50 (2022) compilation, which included the arcade version, the 5200 version, and both the original and voice-enhanced versions for the Atari 2600. To coincide with the release of the Atari 7800+ console in November 2024, Atari released a version of Berzerk compatible for the Atari 7800.

== Reception ==
Atari 2600 review scores

Review scores
Publication	Score
Electronic Fun with Computers and Games	4/4
JoyStik	4/5
Video Review	3/4

Tony Licata, David Pierson, and Dick Welu covered the arcade games presented at AMOA in Play Meter magazine. Pierson found Berzerk interesting and commented that the major hindrance on the game was the player had to use the joystick for both movement and aiming. Welu wrote that Stern's game did not look attractive, but it was still his vote for the best of the show. He complimented the inclusion of Evil Otto and concluded that "people won't be able to quit playing [Berzerk]." Licata listed Atari's Battlezone (1980) as his pick for the best in the show, while stating that Berzerk was another game which really stood out. He described the synthesized voices in the game and its attract mode as highlights while praising the graphics, writing that they fit perfectly for the game without detracting from it.

An anonymous reviewer in Electronic Games wrote that following Atari's announcement to release a version of Berzerk for the Atari 2600, "skepticism ran rampant" about the arcade game being difficult to produce for the system, particularly concerning the poor critical reception for the Atari home console version of Pac-Man (1982). Reviews in the magazines Electronic Games, Electronic Fun with Computers & Games, The Video Game Update, JoyStik and Video Review all found the game to be a strong port of the arcade game, with Electronic Games saying that it was "one of the best arcade-to-home translations any company has produced thus far." Electronic Fun with Computers & Games, Electronic Games and JoyStik all complimented the different mazes which added variety to the game. The Video Game Update also complimented the sounds and visuals, specifically when the Humanoid is electrified by robot fire or by walking into walls. While the Atari 2600 version was described as "generally well regarded" by Craig Grannell of Retro Gamer, McNeil was not keen on the conversions, finding they lacked many of the original game's refinements.

In the magazine TV Gamer, the publication did not include Berzerk as one of the best games for the Vectrex system while concluding that Berzerk translated "surprisingly well" as a Rasterscan despite Evil Otto not looking right, being mostly made up of straight lines. Video game critic Michael Blanchet found the visuals on the Atari 5200 version as simple which he said he would normally criticize, but considered them appropriate for Berzerk. He found the main drawback was the Atari 5200 controller, which was not as responsive as it could be.

At the 1983 Arcade Awards from Electronic Games, along with Infiltrate (1982), the Atari VCS version of Berzerk won the Certificate of Merit award for "Best Solitaire Videogame", being beaten by the ColecoVision release of Donkey Kong (1981).

=== Retrospective ===
Retrospective review scores

Review scores
Publication	Score	
Publication	Arcade	Atari 2600
AllGame	4.5/5	
Computer and Video Games		78%
Eurogamer	7/10	
The Video Games Guide	3/5	

Brett Weiss of AllGame praised the original arcade game for its humor, long-term replayability and its difficulty. Weiss also gave a positive review of the 5200 port reiterating his points, while finding that the Humanoid controlled a bit too slow. A review in Eurogamer for the arcade version said the game lives up to its name, and its "quintessential surrealism makes it almost impossible not to love the game, and any entertainment medium that makes its audience regularly laugh out loud is worth a place in the top 50." Computer and Video Games found that the game did not have a lot of variety, but was fun nonetheless. Matt Fox in his book The Video Games Guide (2012) gave the game three stars, finding the graphics "simple but effective" and that it was satisfying to have the robots chase you blindly only to destroy themselves against the walls of the maze.

In 1995, Flux magazine ranked the arcade version of Berzerk at 55th place on their list of the top 100 video games of all time. In their "Hall of Fame" article, William Cassidy of GameSpy highlighted that the digitized speech as innovative and complimented the game's personality. He found the game tapped into a science fiction and horror archetype which was only presented better in Robotron: 2084 (1982) and declared that Evil Otto was one of the greatest video game villains of all time. IGN echoed this, stating that while the character was generally unknown to a younger generation of gamers, Evil Otto was one of the most well-known video game villains during the "Atari days".

Stuart Hunt and Darran Jones of Retro Gamer included Berzerk in their 2008 list of the top 25 Atari 2600 games. The reviewers stated that it was the best "run-'n'-gun'" game on the Atari 2600 and complimented the animation, specifically the rotating eyes of the cycloptic robots as "menacing and really instilled a feeling that they're scanning the room for a fleshy to kill."

== Legacy ==
=== Player death ===
On April 3, 1982, 18-year-old Peter Burkowski entered Friar Tuck's Game Room in Calumet City, Illinois. After playing and beating the high score in Berzerk, he collapsed and was pronounced dead the same day. Reports in newspapers suggested that officials were investigating if Burkowski's heart attack was due to the stress endured while playing the game. Mark Allen, the deputy coroner, said the autopsy found that the heart attack was due to a scar tissue in his heart which was at least two weeks old. Allen stated: "it's possible that the stress of the games triggered the attack in Peter's weakened heart." The owner of the Friar Tuck's, Tom Blankly, said the player's heart "had a Time Bomb in it that just happened to go off here. I expected it to hurt business, but if anything, business has been up."

Rumors spread since the death of Burkowski that others had died since playing Berzerk, which McNeil denied. McNeil responded that the owner of Friar Tucks said Burkowski ran up the stairs to play the game, was out of breath when he arrived, and collapsed before even finishing his game.

=== Influence and follow-ups ===
Along with Stratovox (1980) and Taskete (1980), Berzerk was one of the earliest examples of speech synthesis in arcade games. Video game critic Michael Blanchet said Berzerk was one of the first games to combine shoot 'em up with maze game mechanics and the first to be a "not-so-cute maze game, and it is still the best." Berzerk had influenced various video games following its release such as Eugene Jarvis' Robotron: 2084. Jarvis described Berzerk as being "amazing" on discovering that if you held down the fire button, the player would not move, but could still change the direction they shot their weapon. This led him to design the game Robotron: 2084 with a second joystick to control the firing direction. McNeil stated "I talked to [the developers of Robotron: 2084] Eugene Jarvis and Larry DeMar when I was considering working for Williams. They are both great guys. I remember Eugene saying that Berzerk irritated them and they wanted to modify it to include some tougher situations. That was the itch they scratched for Robotron. I'm the same way. Something will irritate me and I'll want to improve it or redesign it." Berzerk was also described by authors of Vintage Games (2009) as the unstated inspiration for Castle Wolfenstein (1981). McNeil's game also had clone games, such as Thief (1981).

Mike Mika developed an Atari 2600 homebrew version of Berzerk which included the digitized voice that was initially made available in 2002. Mika stated that the original was of his favorite games for the system and when teaching himself how to program for the Atari 2600, he began adjusting palette colors and testing audio. Other members of the Atari homebrew community such as Dennis Debro dissembled the original game and found code for the robots to shoot diagonally like in the arcade game, which was later added to Berzerk: Enhanced. In 2023, Atari, Inc. announced that they had acquired the rights to Stern's arcade games, including Berzerk. Berzerk: Enhanced was released as a physical Atari 2600 cartridge by Atari in 2023. Sneakybox developed a new Berzerk game titled Berzerk: Recharged (2023) that was published by Atari as part of their Atari Recharged series.

McNeil left Stern a couple of years after Berzerk was released. He said he had been placed in a management position that he found stressful, and was refused a raise. Before quitting, he was offered one last project to make a sequel to Berzerk. As he had leftover ideas that did not make it into the original game, McNeil accepted and developed the sequel Frenzy (1982). Following Berzerk, McNeil made a handful of other games before focusing on work in animation programming. He died in 2017 of a heart attack.

== See also ==
- Golden age of arcade video games
