= Tom Pittman =

Tom Pittman may refer to:

- Tom Pittman (actor), American film and television actor
- Tom Pittman (computer scientist), American computer scientist
- Tom Pittman (rugby union), English-born American rugby union player
