= Microangelo =

Microangelo may refer to the following computer related products:

- MicroAngelo, an early graphics card
- Microangelo Toolset, a collection of software utilities
