= Dennis Allison =

American academic

- Known for: Founder of the People's Computer Company
- Scientific career
- Fields: Computer Science, Electrical Engineering
- Institutions: Stanford University

Dennis Allison is a lecturer at Stanford University, a position he has held since 1976.

Allison was a founding member of the People's Computer Company.

Allison in 1975 wrote a specification for a microcomputer interpreter for the BASIC programming language which became known as Tiny Basic. Allison was urged to create the standard by Bob Albrecht of the Homebrew Computer Club who had seen BASIC on minicomputers and felt it would be the perfect match for new machines like the MITS Altair 8800, which had been released in January 1975. This design did not support text strings or floating point arithmetic, thus only using integer arithmetic. The goal was for the program to fit in 2 to 3 kilobytes of memory.

Allison published his work in the People's Computer Company newsletter in 1975. The Tiny BASIC contents of the newsletter soon became Dr. Dobb's Journal of Tiny BASIC with a subtitle of "Calisthenics & Orthodontia, Running Light Without Overbyte." By the middle of 1976, Tiny BASIC interpreters were available for the Intel 8080, the Motorola 6800 and MOS Technology 6502 processors. This was a forerunner of the free software community's collaborative development before the internet allowed easy transfer of files, and was an example of a free software project before the free software movement.

From 1989 to 2004 Allison and microprocessor architect John H. Wharton coordinated Stanford University's EE-380 Computer Systems Colloquium.
