= John Harrison Wharton =

American software engineer (1954–2018)

John H. Wharton
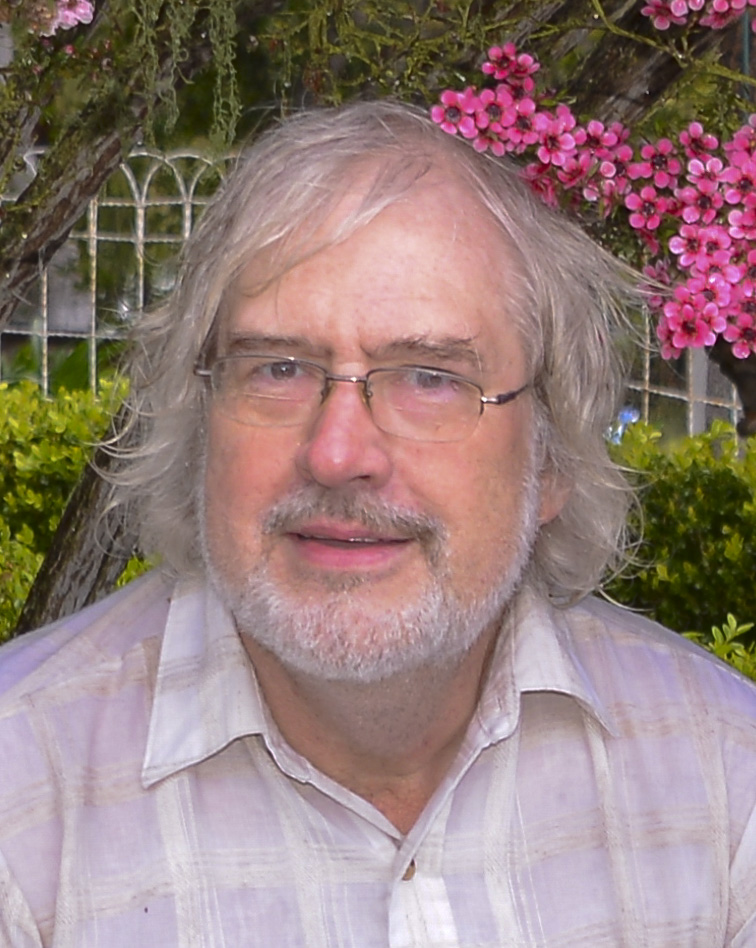
- Born: September 21, 1954
- Died: November 14, 2018 (aged 64); Redwood City, California, USA
- Education: Northwestern University; Yale University
- Engineering career
- Discipline: instruction set architecture; reverse engineering
- Employers: Intel; Applications Research
- Significant design: Intel MCS-51
- Website: www.johnhwharton.com

John Harrison Wharton (21 September 1954 – 14 November 2018) was an American engineer specializing in microprocessors and their applications. Wharton designed the Intel MCS-51, one of the most implemented instruction set architectures of all time.

== Education and career ==
John Wharton grew up in Neenah, Wisconsin, graduating from Neenah High School in 1972. He graduated from Northwestern University with a bachelor's degree in electrical engineering in 1976 and a master's degree in computer science in 1977, having earlier attended Yale University for two years before transferring to Northwestern. He was hired by Intel at the instigation of Tom Rolander, working there for 5 years before leaving to start his consulting company, Applications Research. He was a founding member of the editorial board of Microprocessor Report. He first spoke at the Asilomar Microcomputer Workshop in 1980, along with Carver Mead, Jim Clark, Dave Patterson and Gary Kildall. He first chaired a session in 1983, and became chair of the workshop in 1985, a position he continued to hold through 1997. He was Program Chair from 1999 through 2017. From 1989 to 2004, with Dennis Allison, he coordinated Stanford University's EE380 course.

J. H. Wharton was the architect of the instruction set of the Intel MCS-51, commonly known as the 8051. The MCS-51 and its derivatives are Intel's highest volume microprocessor, and among the most implemented instruction set architectures of all time.

Wharton was the subject of a 1999 New York Times profile, and a 2001 article about his trips to Fiji to collect debris from the deorbit of the Mir space station. In 1996 he appeared on Late Night with David Letterman. His friends have created a memorial Web site.
