= DTACK Grounded =

DTACK Grounded was a computer hobbyist newsletter published from July 1981 to September 1985 by Hal W. Hardenberg. Subtitled "The Journal of Simple 68000 Systems", the newsletter was dedicated to the proposition that the Motorola 68000 CPU could be used to build simple, fast computers. In 1981 this was a revolutionary idea. This was before 68000-based personal computers like the Macintosh had been created. In 1981 Motorola was marketing the 68000 solely as a CPU for Unix workstations. Hal believed that the 68000 could be used as a simple embedded microprocessor as well, and used the newsletter to explain how to do that.

== Editor Hal W. Hardenberg ==
Hal was the editor of the newsletter and wrote almost all of its content. The ostensible purpose of the newsletter was to promote Hal's company's line of 68000-based hardware and software. However, Hal never let that get in the way of telling a good story or explaining how to design or build a fast computer. He was a hardware engineer and a businessman who also knew how to write software. His newsletter was full of amusing and educational stories about the way the personal computer hardware business worked, and strong opinions about the best way to design personal computer hardware and software.

== Etymology ==
"DTACK" is the name of a pin on the Motorola 68000 CPU that informs the CPU that data is ready to be read from memory. It stands for "Data Transfer Acknowledge."

If a system has fast enough memory, this pin can be connected directly to the ground plane (or "grounded") to produce the fastest-possible memory read/write time. However, any complex system would almost certainly have several different types of devices (RAM, ROM, various peripherals) that would support different speeds of access, which in a large system would normally be accommodated by using the DTACK line to insert "wait states"—delays—into bus cycles. (The 68000 has no separate I/O address space, so all I/O devices must be memory-mapped.) The logic circuitry required to pulse DTACK high to add these delays could be fairly complex. Therefore, typically only relatively simple systems can use a design with "DTACK grounded" (i.e., DTACK always asserted). When many different peripherals with different maximum speed capabilities must be used in a small system, another solution to keep DTACK grounded is to slow down the clock rate of the CPU so that all memory and peripheral devices can transfer data at the (reduced) maximum speed of the CPU. In turn, using a lower CPU clock frequency enables a simpler, less expensive circuit board design, with fewer layers, to be used successfully. This, too, like limiting the system to a few peripherals of low diversity, is a design strategy that is typically applied to small or embedded systems but would not be appropriate for high-performance workstations.

Many other microprocessors, including the Intel 8086, 8088, 80286, 80386, 8080, 8085, Zilog Z80, and 6502 family, each have an input pin that serves a similar function to DTACK, but it is usually named READY or RDY. (On the Z80, it is named WAIT.) Therefore, a reference to DTACK distinctively implies the 68000 family of CPUs.

== The Redlands ==
In order to discourage photocopying of the newsletter, a portion of the DTACK Grounded newsletter was printed on dark red paper. This made it harder to photocopy those pages. This section of the newsletter was called "the Redlands". It typically contained the assembly source code for high performance math subroutines.

== DBASIC ==
A major topic in later years of the newsletter was the Halgol interpreter, later converted to the DBASIC interpreter. Hal produced a fast Basic interpreter for the Atari ST computer. It was written in hand-tuned assembly language, and ran very fast compared to other Basics. But it was non-standard: it couldn't run Microsoft BASIC programs, and it couldn't read or write MS-DOS format floppy disks. As a result, it was not very popular.

== Legacy ==
In the 1990s, Hal revived DTACK Grounded as an occasional column in Dr. Dobb's Journal called "DTACK Revisited".
