= Allen Holub =

American author/consultant

Allen I. Holub (born 1955) is a computer author who was published in Dr. Dobb's Journal in the 1980s and then again in the 2010s. He also wrote for SD Times. His 1990 book Compiler Design in C was praised as an accessible reference. He is also a teacher, consultant, and speaker.

== Career ==
Allen Holub received double Bachelor of Arts degrees from the University of California, Berkeley, in Computer Science and Medieval European History. In 1982, he became an instructor for the University of California Berkeley Extension, where he has continued teaching periodically to the present day. He started his consulting company "Holub Associates" in 1983, which has also continued to the present day.

Holub was the Chan-Norris Distinguished Visiting Professor of Computer Science at Mills College for the 2021-2022 academic year, teaching a computer science elective course among other duties.

== Writing ==
Holub is a prolific author and has written many books and articles. His "C Chest" column appeared in Dr. Dobb's Journal from 1984 to 1988. His "Java Toolbox" column appeared in JavaWorld from 1998 to 2004. His bi-monthly "JavaWatch" column was in SD Times from May 2004 to September 2006. Holub also blogged on Agile for Dr. Dobb's Journal from 2011 until its shutdown in 2014.

Compiler Design in C
- Author: Allen I. Holub
- Cover artist: Allen I. Holub and Lundgren Graphics Ltd.
- Publisher: Prentice Hall, Inc.
- Publication date: 1990
- Pages: 984
- ISBN: 0-13-155045-4
- LC Class: QA76.76.C65H65
- Website: https://holub.com/compiler/

His 1990 book Compiler Design in C is a 984-page reference book, recommended by several library services at the time, as well as trade publications and the comp.compiler Usenet group FAQ. It is now out of print, but available as a download on his website. One reviewer stated he preferred it to the "dragon book", Compilers: Principles, Techniques, and Tools, as its code examples made the material more approachable.

Holub's book Taming Java Threads is an edited re-print of a 9-part series from his Java Toolbox column. It has some good information, although is not as broad in coverage as other books. Holub's book Holub on Patterns: Learning Design Patterns by Looking at Code contains a few of his more popular Java Toolbox articles, but is mostly new content. It is a valuable resource for Java software developers.

== Speaking and advocacy ==
Holub signed the Agile Manifesto in March 2014. As of 2023, Holub positions himself as well-versed in Lean/Agile methodology. He has made several controversial statements, such as that software development teams do not need a bug tracking system, do not need estimates, indeed should avoid most of the practices of Scrum, and not deploying on Friday is a huge red flag.

== Personal life ==
In addition to his work in the software industry, Holub is also a composer, musician, artist, and pilot. As of 2023 he resides in Berkeley, CA.
