= People's Computer Company =

Computing newsletter (1972–1981)

People's Computer Company (PCC) was an organization, a newsletter (the People's Computer Company Newsletter) and, later, a quasiperiodical called the Dragonsmoke. PCC was founded and produced by Dennis Allison, Bob Albrecht and George Firedrake in Menlo Park, California in the early 1970s.

The first newsletter, published in October 1972, announced itself with the following introduction:

Computers are mostly used against people instead of for people; used to control people instead of to free them; Time to change all that — we need a … People's Computer Company.

It was published bimonthly. The name was chosen in reference to Janis Joplin's rock group Big Brother and the Holding Company. The newsletter ceased publication in 1981.

== History ==
PCC was one of the first organizations to recognize the potential of Tiny BASIC in the nascent field of personal computing when it published that language's design specification in their newsletter. This ultimately led to the design of an interpreter that was published in a publication, which they named Dr. Dobb's Journal of Tiny BASIC Calisthenics and Orthodontia, dedicated to Tiny BASIC. The newsletter's title was changed to Dr. Dobb's Journal of Computer Calisthenics & Orthodontia for the second issue; the popular reaction to it eventually led to the long-running computer magazine Dr. Dobb's Journal (DDJ) which continued publication until 2009.

PCC was among the first organizations to recognize and actively advocate playing as a legitimate way of learning. It published arguably the first best-sellers in microcomputer literature, My Computer Likes Me When I Speak BASIC and What to Do After You Hit Return. The company was an early proponent of software without copyright, and published much of it in the above books, in DDJ and in another periodical. That magazine originally shared the company's name but it evolved and was later renamed Recreational Computing. It focused on publishing code listings, mostly for games, that users could hand type into their early-model (and some homebrew) personal computers. Because the code was without copyright, authors were free to study it, adapt, rewrite and build upon it. The same was true of the more systems-oriented code published in DDJ. This no-copyright practice was a significant boost to the growing body of microcomputer software and applications, and to the general base of knowledge and developing best practices in the young industry.

PCC also fostered the activities of its child organization, ComputerTown USA!, That formalized PCC's long-standing activism around general computer literacy. At a time when many computers still were kept in clean rooms, PCC was taking them to libraries, grade schools and elder communities. Their activities encouraged hands-on exploration and just trying things. The Logo programming language and turtle graphics gave some users their first experience of controlling something on a computer display. Computer phobia was commonly perceived by PCC staff as a barrier to learning in a significant number of users, even in a large majority of some populations during those early years. Apple Computer's Community Affairs department used ComputerTown USA! to develop curriculum and to conduct intensive trainings for the non-profit recipients of computer hardware and software grants from Apple.

As one of its core philosophical contributions, People's Computer Company recognized in personal computing a great potential for individual empowerment and social improvement. It saw that PCs could bring the same advantages to those hampered by race, class and circumstance as to those with more advantages. It believed a digital commons could lead to more intermingling of individuals from diverse social groups. It supported early models of networking personal computers using telephone lines.

The history of PCC and its role in the evolution of the personal computer was described in Steven Levy's book, Hackers: Heroes of the Computer Revolution. In Levy's book, some of the values and ethics of PCC's founders are examined, particularly the ethics common among members of the hacker community.

== See also ==
- Hacker ethic
- Community Memory
- History of personal computers
