= Interface Age =

Computer magazine published between August 1976 and September 1984

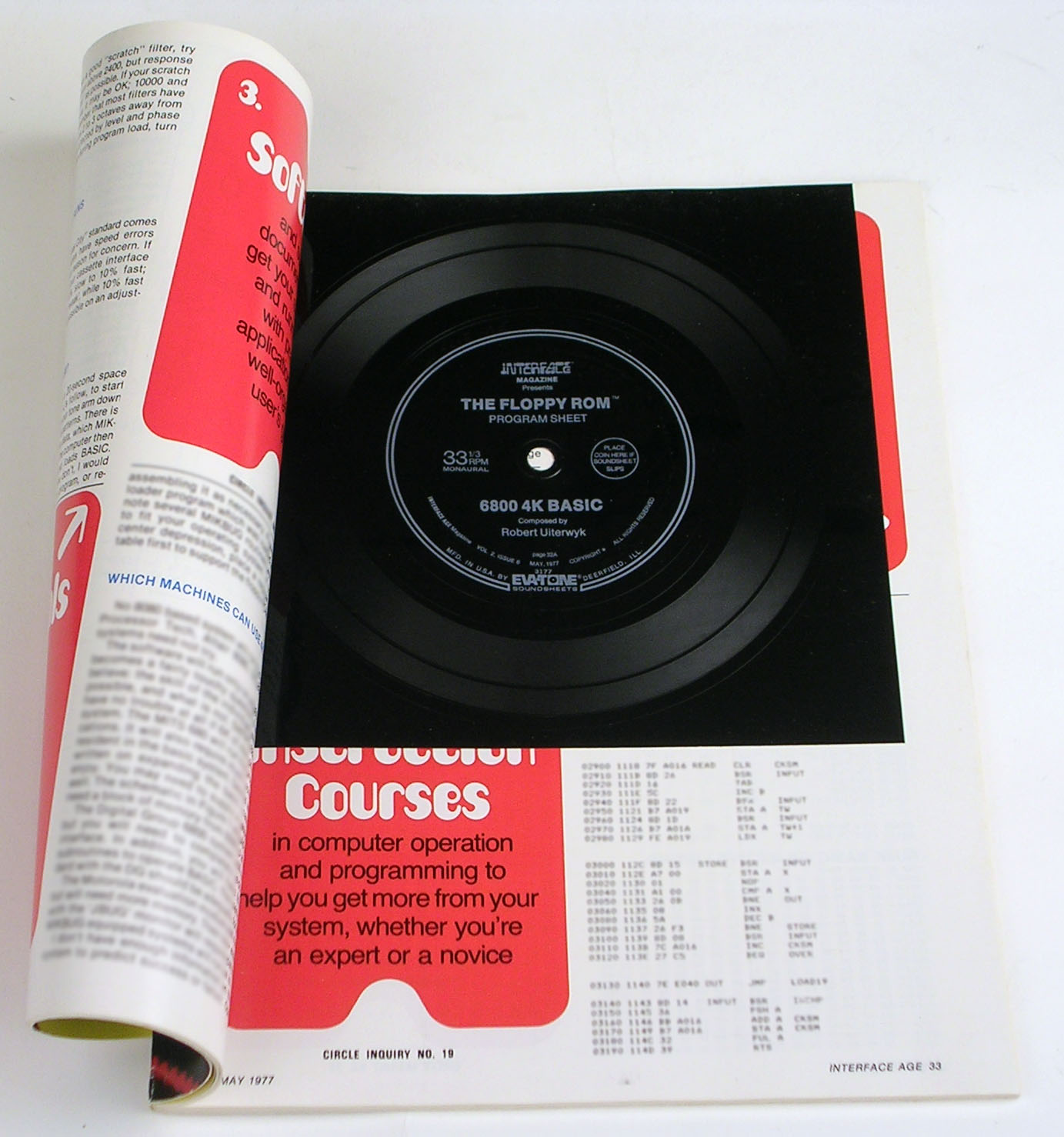
The May 1977 issue featured a Floppy ROM containing a version of Tiny BASIC for the 6800.

Interface Age, "published for the home computerist", was a computer magazine aimed at the early microcomputer and home computer market. Its first issue was published in August 1976 and the last one in September 1984. It had a technical focus for most of its print run.

The magazine started as the newsletter of the Southern California Computer Society, SCCS Interface, which was first published in December 1975. Its publisher, Robert S. Jones, offered to turn it into a professionally produced magazine and established an agreement with the SCCS in which the SCCS would provide a substantial part of the content of the magazine, while Jones would bear the costs of publishing and marketing, with the SCCS sharing in the profits. However, SCCS failed to produce a necessary flow of content, with Jones eventually providing all of the content through his own writers and columnists. Jones ended all connection with the SCCS, and the magazine became simply Interface Age. Its first issue under that name was released as Volume 1, issue 9, continuing its numbering from the original publication.

Like many early personal computer magazines, Interface Age often contained type-in programs written in BASIC that could be used on most platforms of the era. It was perhaps best known for its use of "Floppy ROM"s, very thin vinyl record, known as "sound sheets" containing programs encoded in the Kansas City standard format. One of these included an implementation of a Tiny BASIC interpreter.
