= Tom Pittman (computer scientist) =

American computer scientist

Tom Pittman is an American computer scientist. He was a founding member of the Homebrew Computer Club and known for coauthoring The Art of Compiler Design (1992).

== Biography ==
Pittman received a BA in Math from the University of California, Berkeley in 1966 and a PhD in Computer and Information Science at University of California, Santa Cruz in 1985.

Pittman was a founding member of the Homebrew Computer Club, who created a personal computer based on the low-powered Intel 4004 chip and maintained the Homebrew mailing list. In two months, he wrote a Tiny BASIC interpreter for the Motorola 6800, selling it for only five dollars.

He and James Peters coauthored The Art of Compiler Design (1992), an important introductory textbook to compiler and interpreter design.
