= Dr. Dobb's Journal =

American computer magazine

- Issue #1
- Editor: Andrew Binstock
- Categories: Computer magazines
- Frequency: Monthly
- Circulation: 120,000
- First issue: January 1976; 50 years ago
- Final issue: February 2009 (print)
- Company: People's Computer Company; M&T Publishing; Miller Freeman; CMP Media; United Business Media; UBM Technology Group; Informa PLC
- Country: United States
- Language: English
- Website: https://web.archive.org/web/20080724021246/http://drdobbs.com/
- ISSN: 1044-789X

Dr. Dobb's Journal (often shortened to Dr. Dobb's or DDJ) was a monthly magazine published in the United States by UBM Technology Group, part of UBM. It covered topics aimed at computer programmers. When launched in 1976, DDJ was the first regular periodical focused on microcomputer software, rather than hardware. In its last years of publication, it was distributed as a PDF monthly, although the principal delivery of Dr. Dobb's content was through the magazine's website. Publication ceased at the end of 2014, with the archived website continuing to be available online.

== History ==
Bob Albrecht edited an eccentric newspaper about computer games programmed in BASIC with the same name as the tiny nonprofit educational corporation that he had founded, People's Computer Company (PCC). Dennis Allison was a longtime computer consultant on the San Francisco Peninsula and sometime instructor at Stanford University. The Dobbs title was based on a mashup of the first letters of their names: Dennis and Bob.

=== First issues ===
In the first three quarterly issues of the PCC newspaper published in 1975, Albrecht had published articles written by Allison, describing how to design and implement a stripped-down version of an interpreter for the BASIC language, with limited features to be easier to implement. He called it Tiny BASIC. At the end of the final part, Allison asked computer hobbyists who implemented it to send their implementations to PCC, and they would circulate copies of any implementations to anyone who sent a self-addressed stamped envelope. Allison said, "Let us stand on each others' shoulders; not each others' toes."

The journal was originally intended to be a three-issue xerographed publication. Titled dr. dobb's journal of Tiny BASIC Calisthenics & Orthodontia (with the subtitle Running Light Without Overbyte) it was created to distribute the implementations of Tiny BASIC. The original title was created by Eric Bakalinsky, who did occasional paste-up work for PCC. Dobb's was a contraction of Dennis and Bob. It was at a time when computer memory was very expensive, so compact coding was important. Microcomputer hobbyists needed to avoid using too many bytes of memory.

After the first photocopies were mailed to those who had sent stamped addressed envelopes, PCC was flooded with requests that the publication become an ongoing periodical devoted to general microcomputer software.

PCC agreed, and hired Jim Warren as its first editor. He immediately changed the title to Dr. Dobb's Journal of Computer Calisthenics & Orthodontia prior to publishing the first issue in January 1976. The title refers to "jumping through hoops" (calisthenics) and "pulling teeth" (orthodontia).

=== Early years ===
Jim Warren was DDJ's editor for about a year and a half. While he went on to make a splash with his series of West Coast Computer Faires, subsequent DDJ editors like Marlin Ouverson, Hank Harrison, Michael Swaine and Jonathan Erickson appear to have focused on the journalistic and social aspects of the young but growing microcomputer industry. Eventually PCC, the non-profit corporation, sold DDJ to a commercial publisher.

The newsletter's content was originally pure enthusiast material. Initial interest circled around the Tiny BASIC interpreter, but Warren broadened that to include a variety of other programming topics, as well as a strong consumer bias, especially needed in the chaotic early days of microcomputing. All of the content came from volunteer contributors, with Steve Wozniak as one of the better known of them. Other contributors included Jef Raskin, later credited as a leader in the Macintosh development; Hal Hardenberg, the originator of DTACK Grounded an early newsletter for Motorola 68000 based software and hardware; and Gary Kildall, who had created CP/M, the first disk operating system for microcomputers which was not married to proprietary hardware.

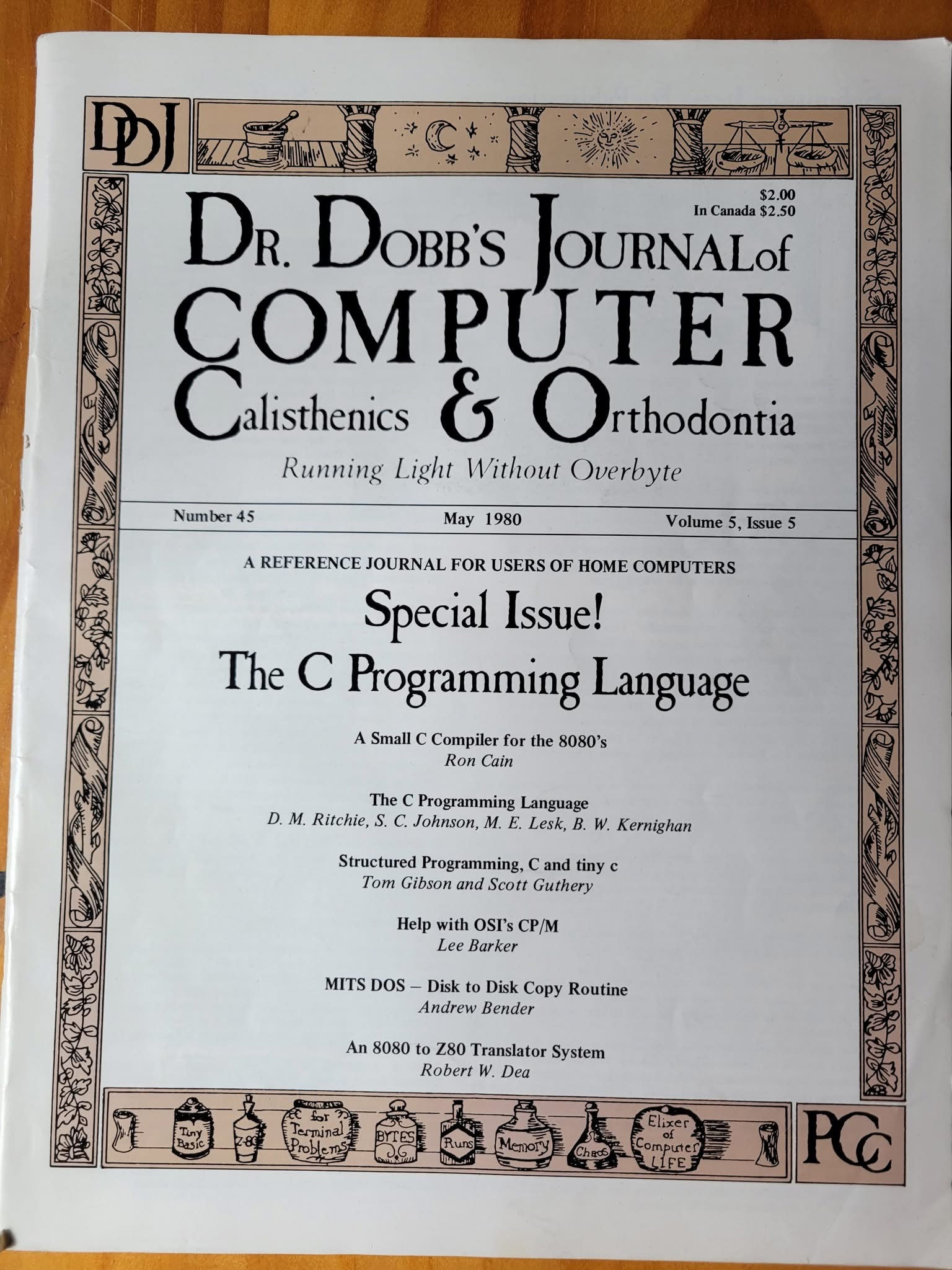
Dr. Dobb's Journal, May 1980 issue

Computer program source code published during the early years include:

- Tiny BASIC interpreter
- Palo Alto Tiny BASIC by Li-Chen Wang
- Small-C compiler by Ron Cain
- Music programs

There were also projects for computer speech synthesis and computer music systems. The March 1985 issue "10(3)" printed Richard Stallman's "GNU Manifesto" a call for participation in the then-new free software movement.

=== Discontinuation of printed edition ===
Dr. Dobb's Journal, December 2000 issue

In later years, the magazine received contributions from developers all over the world working in application development and embedded systems across most programming languages and platforms. The magazine's focus became more professional. Columnists included Michael Swaine, Allen Holub and Verity Stob, the pseudonymous British programmer.

The title was later shortened to Dr. Dobb's Journal, then changed to Dr. Dobb's Journal of Software Tools as it became more popular. The magazine later reverted to Dr. Dobb's Journal with the selling line, "The World of Software Development", with the abbreviation DDJ also used for the corresponding website. In January 2009 Jonathan Erickson, the editor-in-chief, announced the magazine would cease monthly print publication, become a section of InformationWeek called Dr Dobb's Report, a website and monthly digital PDF edition.

=== Later history ===
The primary Dr. Dobb's content streams at the end were the Dr. Dobb's website, Dr. Dobb's Journal (the monthly PDF magazine, which had different content from the website) and a weekly newsletter, Dr. Dobb's Update. In addition, Dr. Dobb's continued to run the Jolt Awards and, since 1995, the Dr. Dobb's Excellence in Programming Award. Regular bloggers include Scott Ambler, Walter Bright, Andrew Koenig, and Al Williams. Adrian Bridgwater edited the news section beginning in 2010.

=== End ===
On December 16, 2014, an article by editor-in-chief Andrew Binstock announced that Dr. Dobb's would cease publication of new articles at the end of 2014. Archived articles are still available online. While no longer distributed, Dr. Dobb's is widely considered an important and influential source for the history of the personal computer industry.

== See also ==
- DTACK Grounded
- Component Developer Magazine

Interview with Jim Warren
