= Cromemco Z-2 =

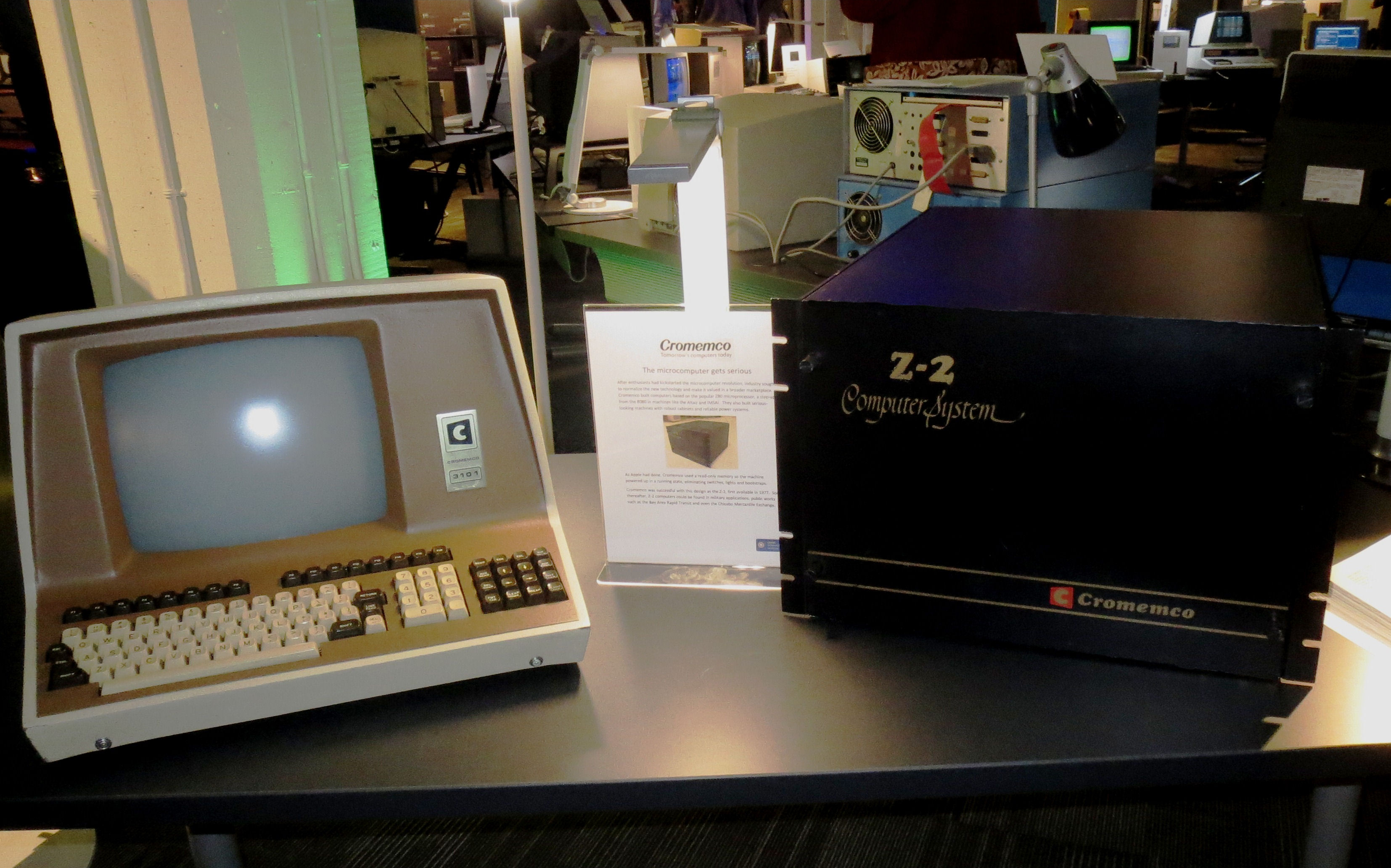
- Cromemco Z-2 CPU unit and terminal
- Developer: Cromemco
- Type: Microcomputer
- Released: 1977; 49 years ago
- Operating system: CP/M, Cromemco DOS
- CPU: Zilog Z80

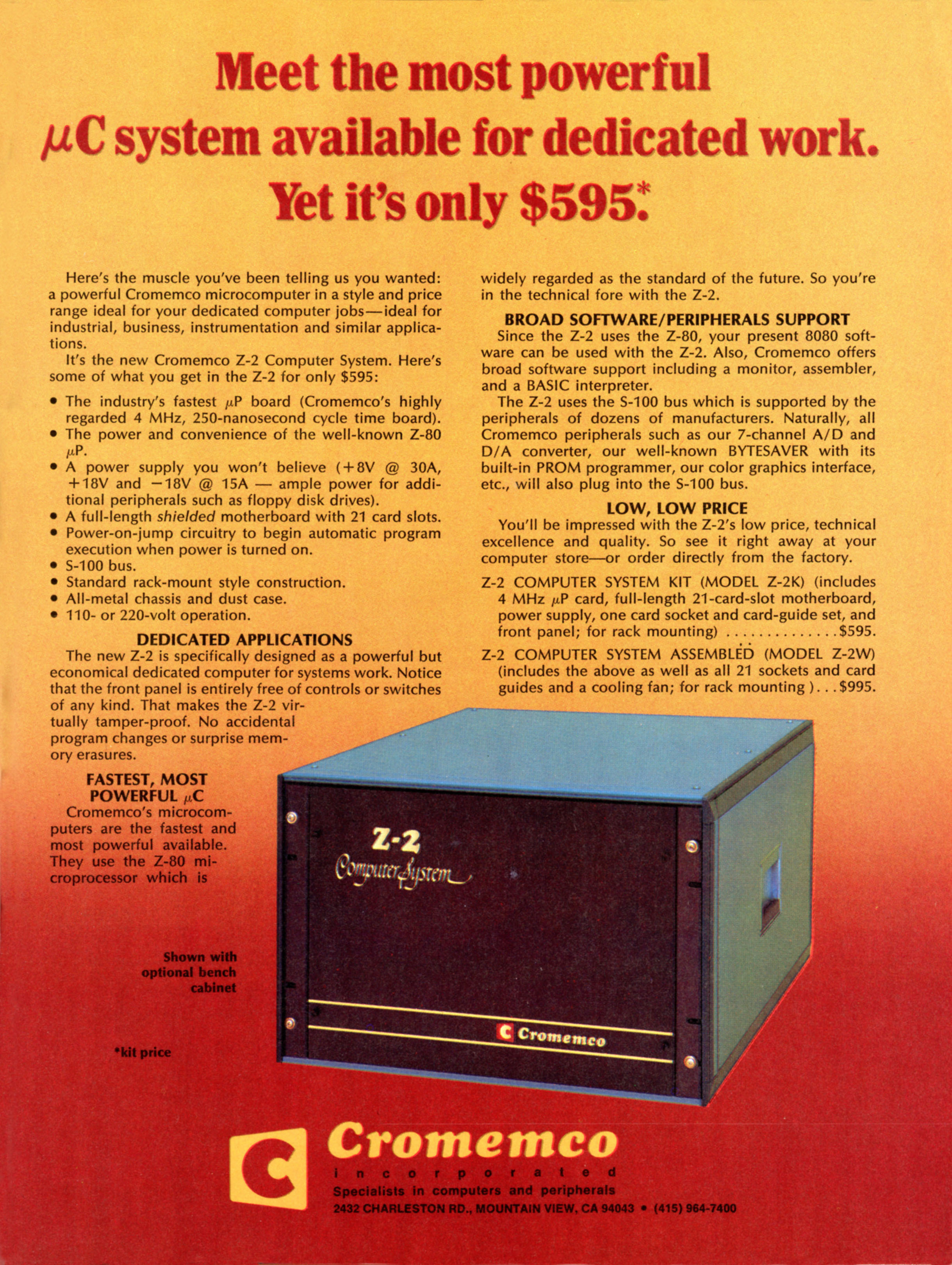
Cromemco Z2 advertisement, July 1977

Z-2 is a series of microcomputers made by Cromemco, Inc. which were introduced to the market in the middle to late 1970s. They were S-100 bus machines powered by the Zilog Z80 processor and typically ran on the CP/M operating system.

They were originally available in assembled or kit form to serve both a commercial market and the computer enthusiast market. Later the machines were only available factory-assembled. The machines were widely respected for their speed, configurability, durability, and reliability.

The Z-2 was a Z80–based microcomputer system that was introduced in 1977. The original Z-2 in kit form included a ZPU-K Z80 CPU card, S-100 bus motherboard, all-metal rack-mount chassis and dust case, card socket and card guide; the assembled form included a complete set of sockets and card guides, and a cooling fan. The Z-2 series was capable of supporting up to 21 S-100 boards and could be configured with any of the boards supplied by Cromemco.

The Z-2 gave an impression of solidity due to its hefty 450-watt power supply and heavy metal chassis. A TU-ART (dual serial and parallel board), 4FDC Floppy Disk Controller, one or more 16KZRAM cards, and a Wangco 5¼" floppy disk drive would be added to form a basic system.

An unusual feature of the Z-2 was switch–selectable CPU speed; 250 or 500 nanosecond cycle time were available. The ZPU speed was 4 MHz at a time when 2 MHz was normal, and boards from other manufacturers might still require the slower speed. The ZPU card in the Z-2 could address up to 64 kilobytes (65,536 bytes) of RAM. However, the 16KZ memory card supported bank-switching with 8 banks of 64 kilobytes each. When using the 16KZ, the maximum RAM of the Z-2 was limited by the available S-100 slots. If 16 of the slots were occupied by 16KZ cards, then the system had 4 banks of 64 kilobytes each, for a total of 256 kilobytes (262,144 bytes).

Additional S-100 slots were required for cards controlling peripherals, disk drives, and I/O interfaces. Communication with the processor was normally performed through a TU-ART or other S-100 bus compatible interface card, which could run a CRT terminal or teletype.

== Cromemco Z-2D ==
The Cromemco Z-2D computer was a Z80–based microcomputer system which differed from a Z-2 by having one or two Wangco 5¼" disk drives, a disk power supply and a 4FDC disk controller in a Z-2 chassis. The Z-2D was available in assembled and kit form. The Z-2D was also called the "System Two".

== Cromemco Z-2H ==
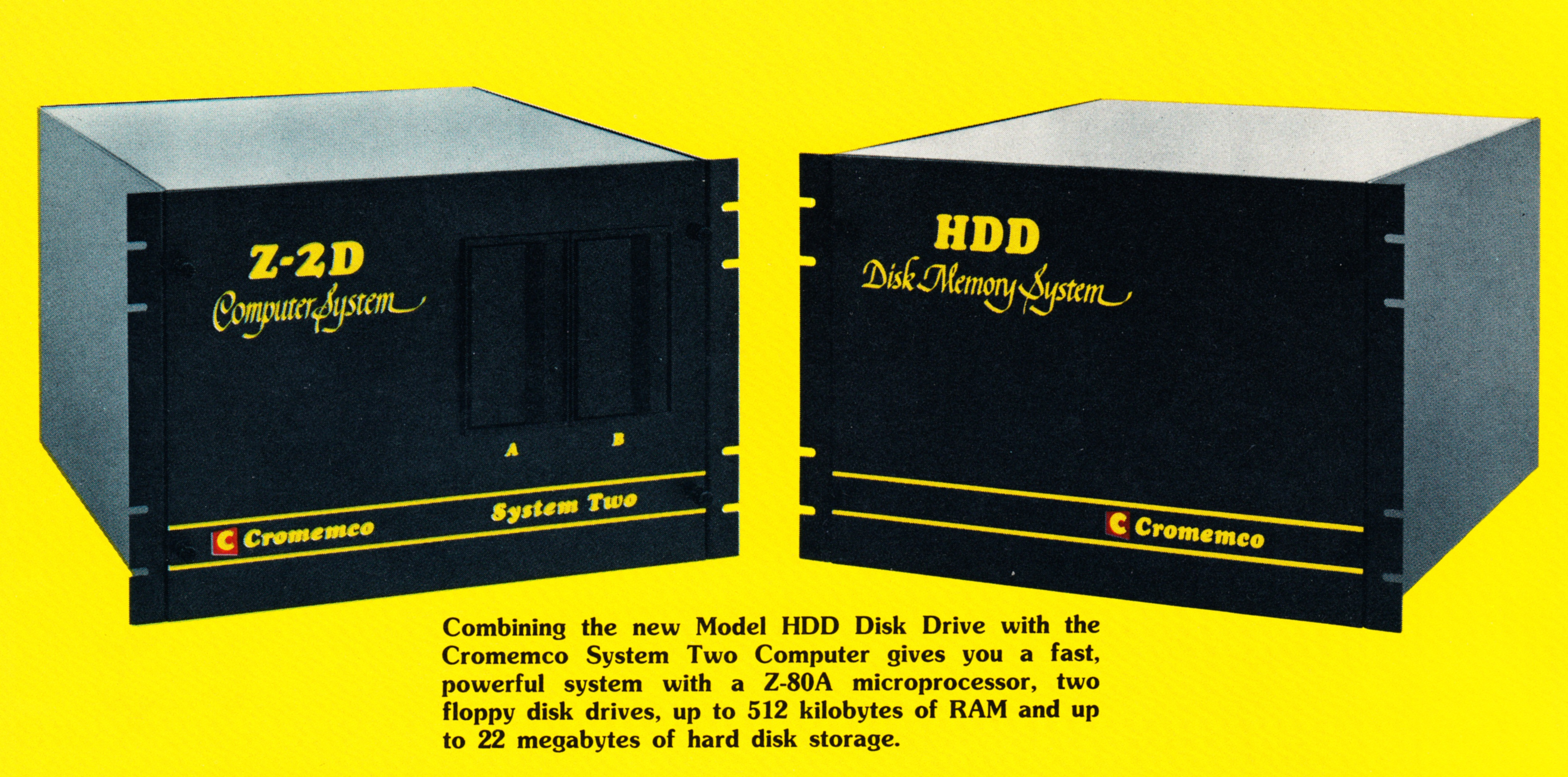
Cromemco Z-2D computer with optional HDD hard disk drive providing up to 22 megabytes of storage (1980)

The Cromemco Z-2H computer was based on the Z-2D, but in addition had an 11 megabyte internal hard disk drive. While the Z-2 and Z-2D had 21 S-100 slots, the Z-2H was limited to 12 expansion slots due to the size of the internal hard disk. Over 1000 Z-2H systems were sold in the first six months on the market. The 11-megabyte hard disks were also offered as a separate unit, the HDD, that could be used with a Z-2D computer. The HDD came with either one or two hard disks, for up to 22 megabytes of storage.

Cromemco Z-2 Microcomputer Systems
System	Year Introduced	S-100 slots	Internal Floppy Disk	Internal Hard Disk
Z-2	1977	21	n/a	n/a
Z-2D	1978	21	2 x 5-inch	n/a
Z-2H	1979	12	2 x 5-inch	11 megabytes

== Notable installations ==
The Chicago Mercantile Exchange (CME) adopted Cromemco Z-2 microcomputers as the backbone of the CME trading floor, employing a total of 60 Z-2 systems. For a 10-year period every trade at the CME was processed by these Cromemco systems. In 1992 the Cromemco systems were replaced by IBM PS/2 computers.

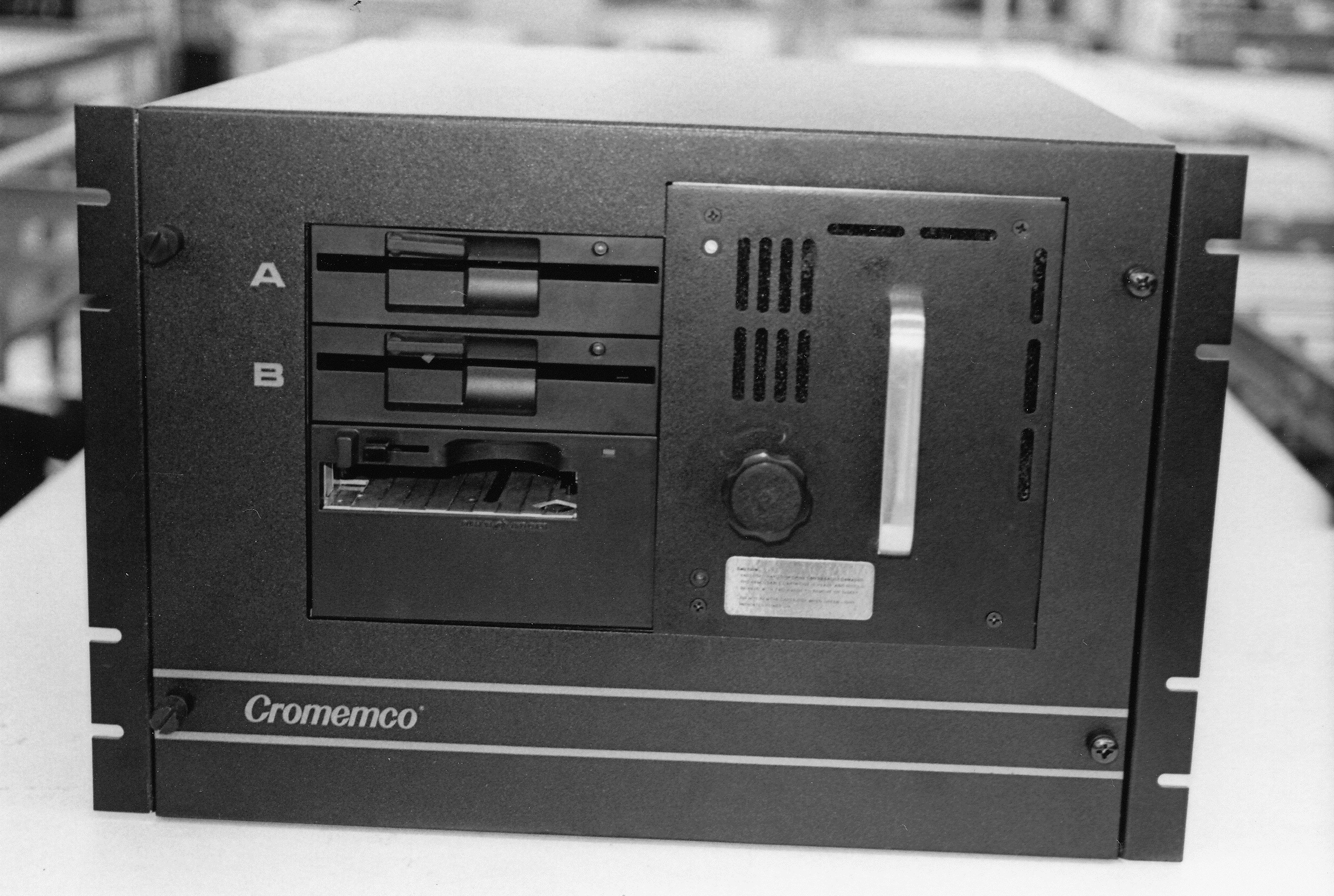
Cromemco Z-2 System with removable hard disk was deployed worldwide by the United States Air Force (1986).

Z-2 computers were well-suited for data acquisition and analysis applications. One example was work in profiling the deceleration of trains during braking in the San Francisco Bay Area Rapid Transit (BART) system during actual operation. Cromemco Z-2D computers were employed both for data acquisition and analysis to develop an exact model of the braking profile under a variety of track conditions and train loadings.

In 1979 the United States Navy (at the Applied Physics Laboratory) used a Cromemco Z-2 computer to generate speech output for the Aegis Combat System in the Combat Information Center.

The United States Air Force deployed 600 Cromemco Systems from 1985 to 1996 as Mission Support Systems for the F-15, F-16, and F-111 aircraft. During this period Cromemco systems were used for the planning of every combat mission for these aircraft, including missions during the First Gulf War. These systems were based on the Cromemco Z-2 computer, but utilized the Motorola 68020 32-bit processor, and had a custom, removable hard drive to meet the Air Force need to be able to physically secure all flight plan information. Cromemco received a patent on this technology.
