= Beehive Medical Electronics =

Beehive Medical Electronics, later known as Beehive International, was a manufacturer of computer display terminals.

== History ==
The company was based in Salt Lake City, Utah and manufactured a variety of CRT display terminals in the 1970s and 1980s.

At its peak, Beehive employed 400 people. In 1980, the company opened a plant in Ireland.

The company filed for Chapter 11 bankruptcy reorganization in October 1984 and emerged from Chapter 11 in 1985.

Beehive outsourced production to Standard Elektrik Lorenz AG in West Germany in July, 1988. The company filed for Chapter 7 bankruptcy in November 1988 and the assets were auctioned off in January, 1989.

The terminal models included the ATL-008, MiniBee, the SuperBee and the B-100. The B-100 was also provided to original equipment manufacturers for rebranding. The Cromemco 3101 terminal is a rebranded B-100.
