= Steven Sasson =

American electrical engineer

Steve Sasson
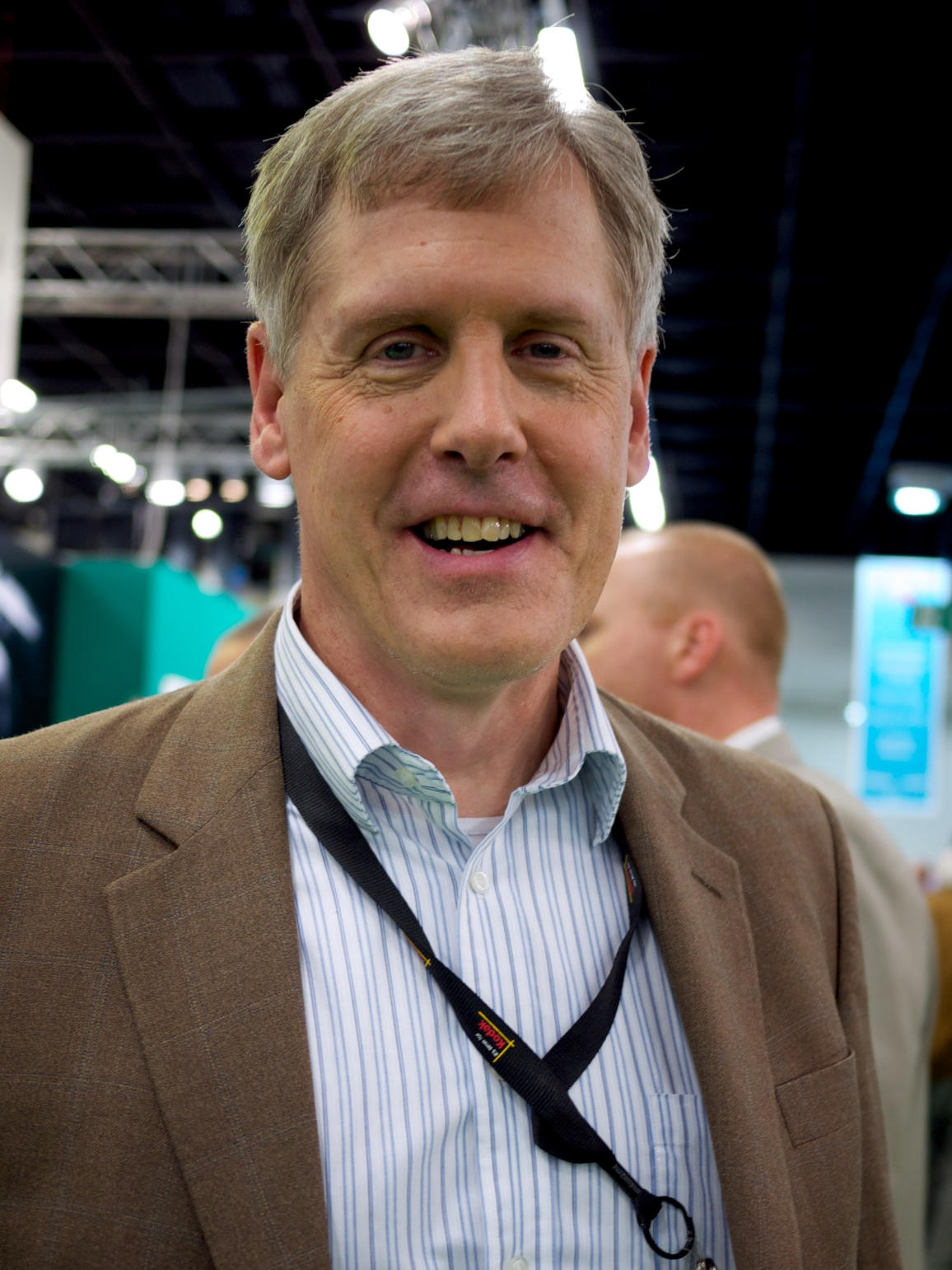
- Steve Sasson at Photokina 2013
- Born: New York City
- Education: Rensselaer Polytechnic Institute (BS, 1972; MS, 1973)
- Occupations: Electrical engineer Inventor
- Known for: Inventor of the first self-contained digital camera

Steven J. Sasson is an American electrical engineer and the inventor of the self-contained (portable) digital camera. He joined Kodak shortly after his graduation from engineering school and retired from Kodak in 2009.

== Early life and education ==
Sasson was born in Brooklyn, New York, the son of Ragnhild Tomine (Endresen) and John Vincent Sasson. His mother was Norwegian.

He attended and graduated from Brooklyn Technical High School. He is a 1972 (BS) and 1973 (MS) graduate of Rensselaer Polytechnic Institute in electrical engineering.

== First self-contained digital camera ==
Steven Sasson developed a portable, battery operated, self-contained digital camera at Kodak in 1975. It weighed 8 pounds (3.6 kg) and used a Fairchild CCD image sensor having only 100 × 100 pixels (0.01 megapixels). The images were digitally recorded onto a cassette tape, a process that took twenty-three seconds per image. His camera took images in black and white. As he set out on his design project, he envisioned a camera without mechanical moving parts (although his device did have moving parts, such as the tape drive).

In 1977, Kodak filed a patent application on some features of Sasson's prototype camera. Titled "electronic still camera", the patent listed Sasson and Gareth Lloyd as co-inventors. The issued patent, U.S. patent number 4,131,919, claims an arrangement that allows the CCD to be read out quickly ("in real time") into a temporary buffer of random-access memory and then written to storage at the lower speed of the storage device. Some modern digital cameras still use such an arrangement, which had been described in an earlier MIT patent that also stored digital images using a digital tape recorder, but employed a vidicon sensor rather than a CCD. Sasson's prototype camera was first disclosed publicly in a May, 2000 presentation by Kodak which described the evolution of digital cameras.

His prototype was not the first camera that produced digital images, but it was the first hand-held digital camera that included non-volatile storage. Earlier examples of digital cameras included the Multi Spectral Scanner on Landsat 1, developed by Virginia Norwood, which took digital photographs of Yosemite prior to its launch in 1972; cameras used for astronomical photography; experimental devices by Michael Francis Tompsett et al.; and the commercial product and hobbyist camera called the Cromemco Cyclops, a handheld digital camera that produced digital images which could be stored in a separate computer.

== Life and career ==
His work on digital cameras began in 1975 with a broad assignment from his supervisor at Eastman Kodak Company, Gareth A. Lloyd: to attempt to build an electronic camera using a commercially available charge-coupled device (CCD). The resulting camera invention was awarded the U.S. patent number 4,131,919.

Sasson retired from Eastman Kodak Company in 2009 and began working as a consultant in an intellectual property protection role. Sasson joined the University of South Florida Institute for Advanced Discovery & Innovation in 2018, where he is a member and courtesy professor.

On November 17, 2009, U.S. President Barack Obama awarded Sasson the National Medal of Technology and Innovation at a ceremony in the East Room of the White House. This is the highest honor awarded by the US government to scientists, engineers, and inventors. On September 6, 2012, the Royal Photographic Society awarded Sasson its Progress Medal and Honorary Fellowship "in recognition of any invention, research, publication or other contribution that has resulted in an important advance in the scientific or technological development of photography or imaging in the widest sense." Leica Camera AG honored Sasson by presenting to him one of its cameras at the Photokina 2010 trade show event. Sasson was inducted into the National Inventors Hall of Fame in 2011, and later elected as a Fellow of the National Academy of Inventors in 2018.

== Patents ==
- U.S. patent 4,131,919 Patent – Electronic Still camera
