= ColorGraphics Weather Systems =

American computer graphics company

ColorGraphics Weather Systems was a computer graphics company that pioneered the use of computer graphics for displaying weather forecasts on local television. Formed in 1979 by Terry Kelly and Richard Daly, it is now part of Weather Central, another of Kelly's companies.

== History ==
After graduating from the University of Wisconsin–Madison in 1971 with a degree in meteorology, Terry Kelly took a job with Madison, Wisconsin, television station WKOW calculating weather predictions. Over the next two years he introduced a number of new techniques to the industry, including using magnets to represent high and low points, color markers on a whiteboard for graphics, and later hand-photographing satellite cloud imagery with a Bolex camera to produce the first cloud-movement animations.

Kelly and several of his colleagues also produced weather forecasting software. In 1974 he was promoted to chief meteorologist at WKOW, and at the same time started Weather Central to sell and operate their software for smaller organizations such as ski resorts and local highway departments.

ColorGraphics was formed in 1979 as a partnership between Kelly and Richard Daly. Kelly and Daly had both worked in the University of Wisconsin's Space Science and Engineering department, developers of the McIDAS weather display system. McIDAS used downloaded satellite cloud cover images and superimposed them on locally generated maps. Designed for the National Weather Service, McIDAS was a high-end system well beyond the budget of a television station.

Kelly's idea was to adapt the McIdas concept for lower cost home computer systems that were appearing in the late 1970s. Their first system, "LiveLine", was based on the Apple II. Its graphics system could not be genlocked, so a TV camera had to be pointed at the screen to send the video into the production systems. This initial system was soon replaced by a similar one running on Cromemco computers using a newer version of their Dazzler color-graphics card (the Super Dazzler Interface (SDI)). In spite of its simplicity and low resolution, the fast production and "high tech" look caught on, and by the mid-1980s the system was almost universal, replacing bluescreen systems on cardboard maps that had previously been used. The company noted that 70% of the top 50 TV markets were using the system by 1982. By 1984 80% of all television stations in the country were using ColorGraphics system, built on Cromemco microcomputers, to generate weather, news, and sports graphics.

In 1982 the company was purchased by Dynatech Corporation, an expanding electronics company. Dynatech purchased Cromemco in 1987 and rolled the two companies together, before divesting all of its media properties in the early 1990s. Kelly and Daly purchased the rights back from Dynatech in 1994, operating under the Weather Central name. In 1995 they introduced the new "GENESIS" platform on Silicon Graphics computers, which later moved onto Hewlett-Packard workstations.
