= Cromemco DOS =

1977 microcomputer operating system

- Developer: Cromemco
- OS family: CP/M-like
- Working state: Discontinued
- Source model: Closed source
- Initial release: June 1977; 48 years ago
- Supported platforms: Zilog Z80
- Default user interface: Command-line interface (CONPROC.COM)
- License: Proprietary

Cromemco DOS or CDOS (an abbreviation for Cromemco Disk Operating System) is a CP/M-like operating system by Cromemco designed to allow users of Cromemco microcomputer systems to create and manipulate disk files using symbolic names.

== Overview ==
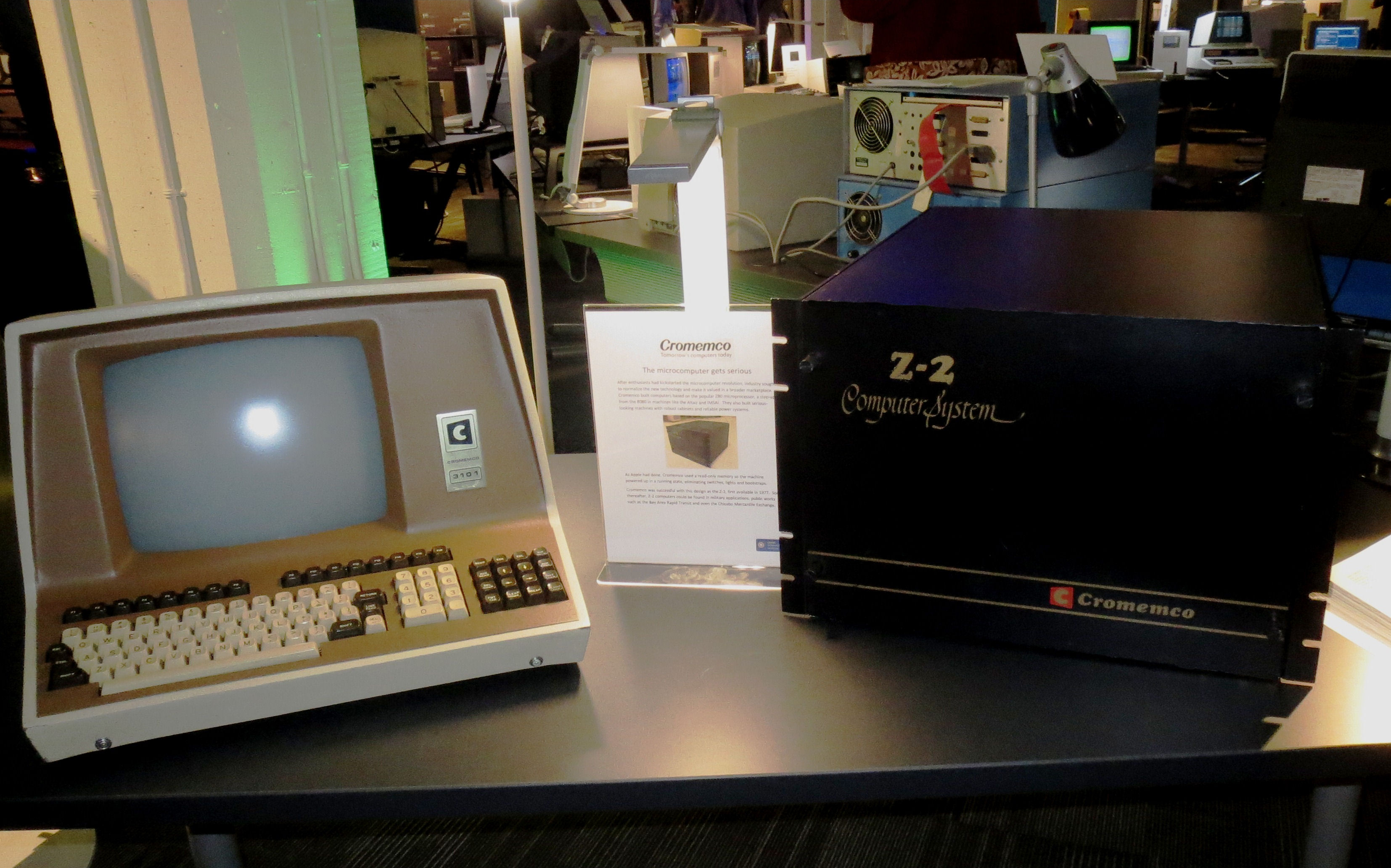
Cromemco Z-2 CPU unit and terminal

CDOS was written in Zilog Z80 machine code. Due to the number of available programs available to run under Digital Research CP/M at that time, CDOS was designed to be upwards CP/M-compatible. Many programs written for CP/M versions up to and including version 1.33 run without modification under CDOS. However, programs written for CDOS generally do not run under CP/M.

The Cromemco Z-2 had the ability to run Cromemco DOS. Besides CP/M 2.2 and Cromix, the Cromemco System One can also run Cromemco DOS. The Cromemco C-10 personal computer, introduced in 1982, also ran CDOS.

An emulator for a Cromemco CDOS system exists.

== Commands ==
The following list of commands are supported by Cromemco DOS.

=== Intrinsic commands ===
- BYE
- DIR
- ERA
- REN
- SAVE
- TYPE

Later versions also support the ATTR command.

=== Extrinsic command programs ===
- @ (Batch)
- DUMP
- EDIT
- INIT (Initialize)
- STAT (Disk Status)
- WRTSYS (Write System)
- XFER (Transfer)

Later versions also support the MEMTEST command.

== See also ==
- Harry Garland
- Roger Melen
