= Cromemco Octart =

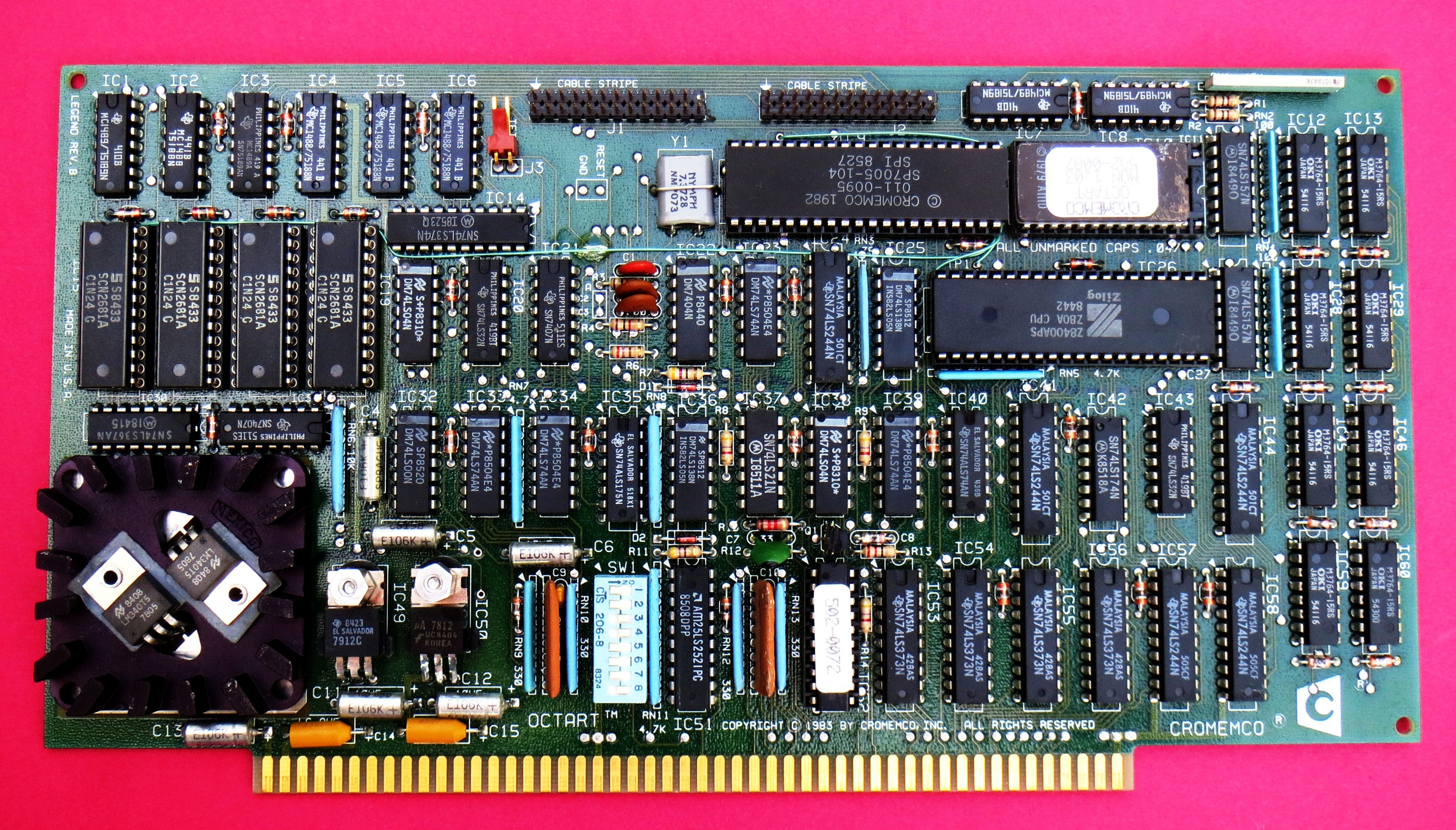
Cromemco Octart S-100 card (1983)

The Cromemco Octart was an expansion card made by Cromemco for their range of S-100 bus based computer systems. Released in late 1983, the Octart provided a significantly less expensive alternative to dedicated multi-user computer systems.

== Description ==
The Octart provided eight serial bus channels and a single bi-directional parallel port. The serial connections were often used to interface eight computer terminals to the host system. In combination with the Cromemco Cromix multi-user operating system, this allowed different users to concurrently work on the system. The parallel port was typically connected to an IEEE 1284-type printer.

Octart consolidated Cromemco's TUART, QUADART, and IOP boards into one board. Unlike earlier boards, which merely formatted and exchanged individual data characters, the Octart featured a sophisticated dual UART communications circuit plus an independent Z80A processor with 64 KB bytes of memory. This enabled the Octart to:

- perform all protocol and error detection and correction functions;
- buffer large amounts of serial data; and
- pass only preprocessed data over the host bus using interrupt-driven I/O.

This reduced the processing load on the host computer's central processing unit and dramatically increased system throughput.

The Octart was a versatile serial subsystem. Under program control, it could switch its internal memory configuration from 16 KB bytes of ROM and 32 KB bytes of RAM to a full 64 KB bytes of RAM. Thus the board can include a ROM bootstrap program which loads an application program, and then switches to 64 KB bytes of RAM for maximum buffer space. The eight serial channels could operate independently of one another in any of four modes: full duplex, auto echo, local loopback, and remote loopback. Each channel could be programmed to automatic wake-up mode for multidrop applications.

The Octart required Z80 Cromix version 11.24 or later or 68000 Cromix 20.61 or later.
