= George E. Crothers =

American judge

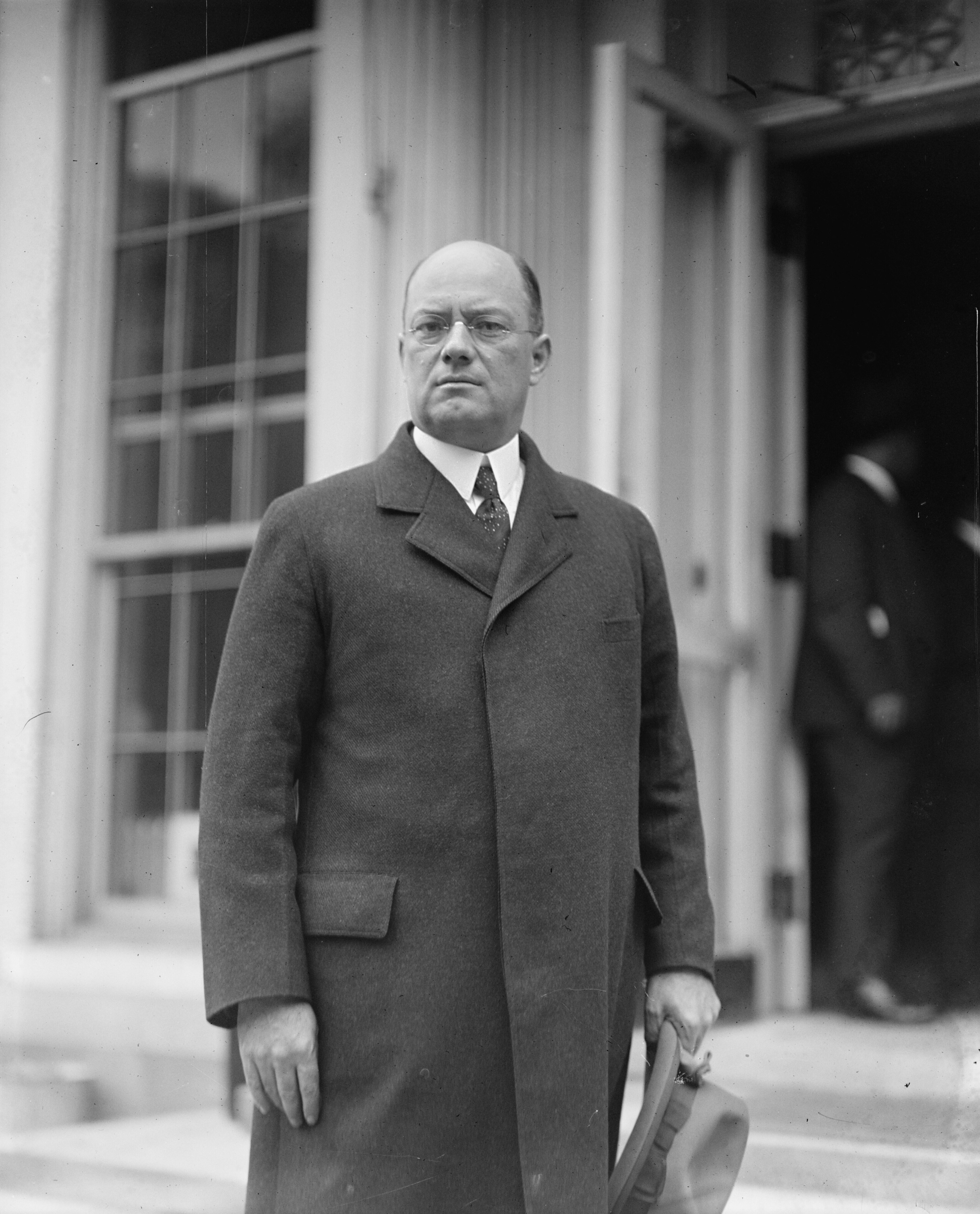
Crothers in 1923

George Edward Crothers (May 27, 1870 – May 16, 1957) was one of the first students at Stanford University and was instrumental in putting the university on a solid legal and financial footing following the deaths of its founders, Leland and Jane Stanford. He served as a member of Stanford's board of trustees and as a California superior court judge. His monetary gifts to his alma mater made possible the construction of two student residences on the Stanford campus—one named for himself, the other dedicated to the memory of his mother.

== Early life ==
George Crothers was born on May 27, 1870, in Wapello, Iowa, to John Crothers and Margaret Jane Crothers (née Fair), who had emigrated to the United States from Ireland the previous year. The family moved to San Jose, California, in 1883, and George enrolled at Stanford in 1891 as part of the new university's "pioneer class". He received a Bachelor of Arts degree from Stanford in 1895, followed by a law degree in 1896.

== Career ==
Crothers set up a law practice with his brother, Thomas—also a Stanford graduate and a lawyer—and became a close adviser to Jane Stanford. Together with his brother, Crothers identified and corrected numerous major legal defects in the terms of the university's founding grant and successfully lobbied for an amendment to the California state constitution granting Stanford an exemption from taxation on its educational property—a change which allowed Jane Stanford to donate her stock holdings to the university. In 1902, Crothers became the first alumnus of Stanford to serve as a member of the university's board of trustees.

Crothers became involved in legal action over the estate of his maternal uncle, James Graham Fair. Nettie Craven claimed to have been married to Fair at the time of his death, but at a 1900 trial, Crothers' detailed analysis of the handwriting on the documents Craven had offered in support of her claim convinced the court that they were forgeries.

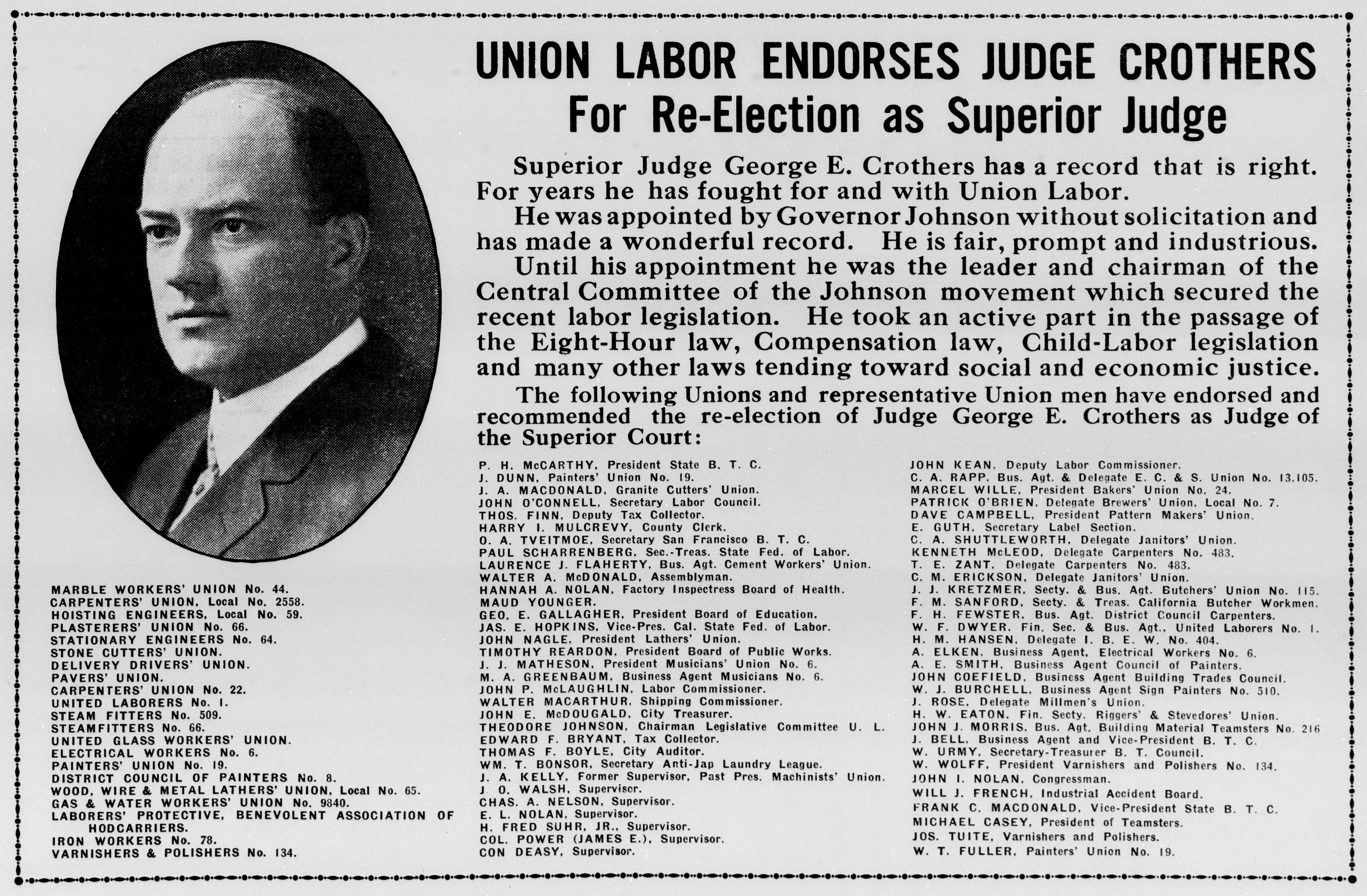
Union Labor campaign ad for Crothers's reelection published in the Labor Clarion, October 23, 1914

From 1913 to 1921, Crothers served as a judge of the Superior Court in San Francisco, California. One case which came before him involved a physician whose license had been revoked by the State Board of Medical Examiners for performing an abortion. Judge Crothers refused to overturn the board's revocation on technical grounds, and his decision was upheld on appeal. Even after Crothers' retirement from the bench and his return to private law practice, he was commonly referred to as "Judge" throughout the rest of his life. In a 1956 letter, former U.S. president (and Stanford classmate) Herbert Hoover wrote, "Judge George E. Crothers was my good friend in bad times and in good times for over sixty years".

== Philanthropy ==
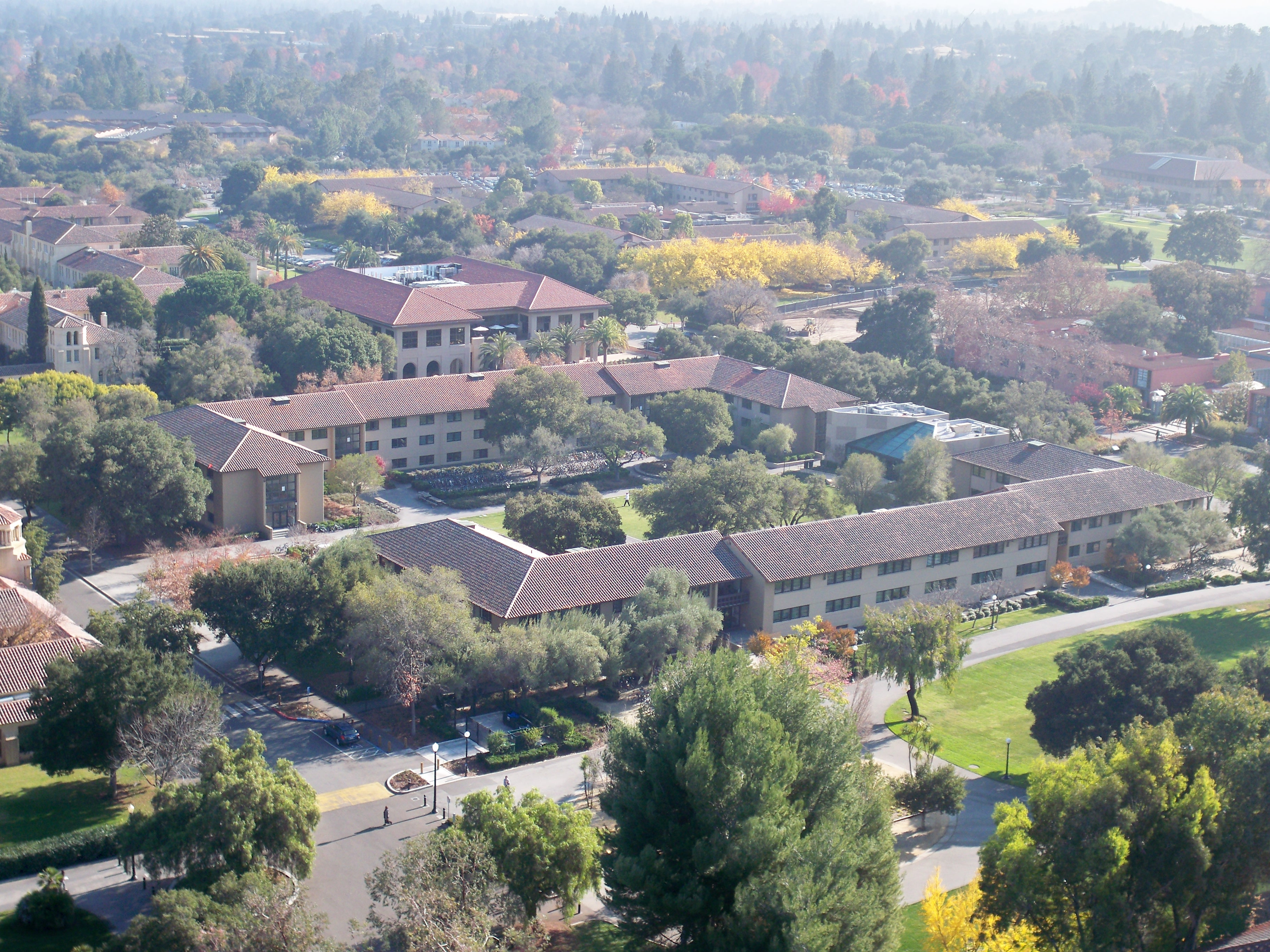
The Crothers Halls on the Stanford University campus

Crothers established a scholarship fund for Stanford law students in 1912. In 1929, he established an annual prize fund for literary composition at the University of California. A set of carillon bells for Grace Cathedral in San Francisco was cast with the help of donations from Crothers and other benefactors.

In his later years, Crothers made a donation to Stanford for the construction of Crothers Hall, an on-campus dormitory for law students which opened in 1948. With the help of additional gifts by Crothers, a second residence (for graduate students in engineering) was built next to the first; opened in 1955, it was named Crothers Memorial Hall in memory of the judge's mother. These two residences were extensively renovated and converted into undergraduate housing in 2009. The name "Crothers Memorial" is commonly abbreviated to "Cro Mem" — a short form which was the inspiration for the early personal computer company Cromemco.

== Personal life ==
Crothers married Elizabeth Mills in 1911. They were unable to have children, and Elizabeth was 38 years old when she died in 1920.

== Death ==
Crothers died at Stanford Hospital in Palo Alto, California, on May 16, 1957. He is buried in San Jose, California, along with his parents.
