= Cromemco Cyclops =

First all-digital solid-state camera

Cromemco Cyclops Camera
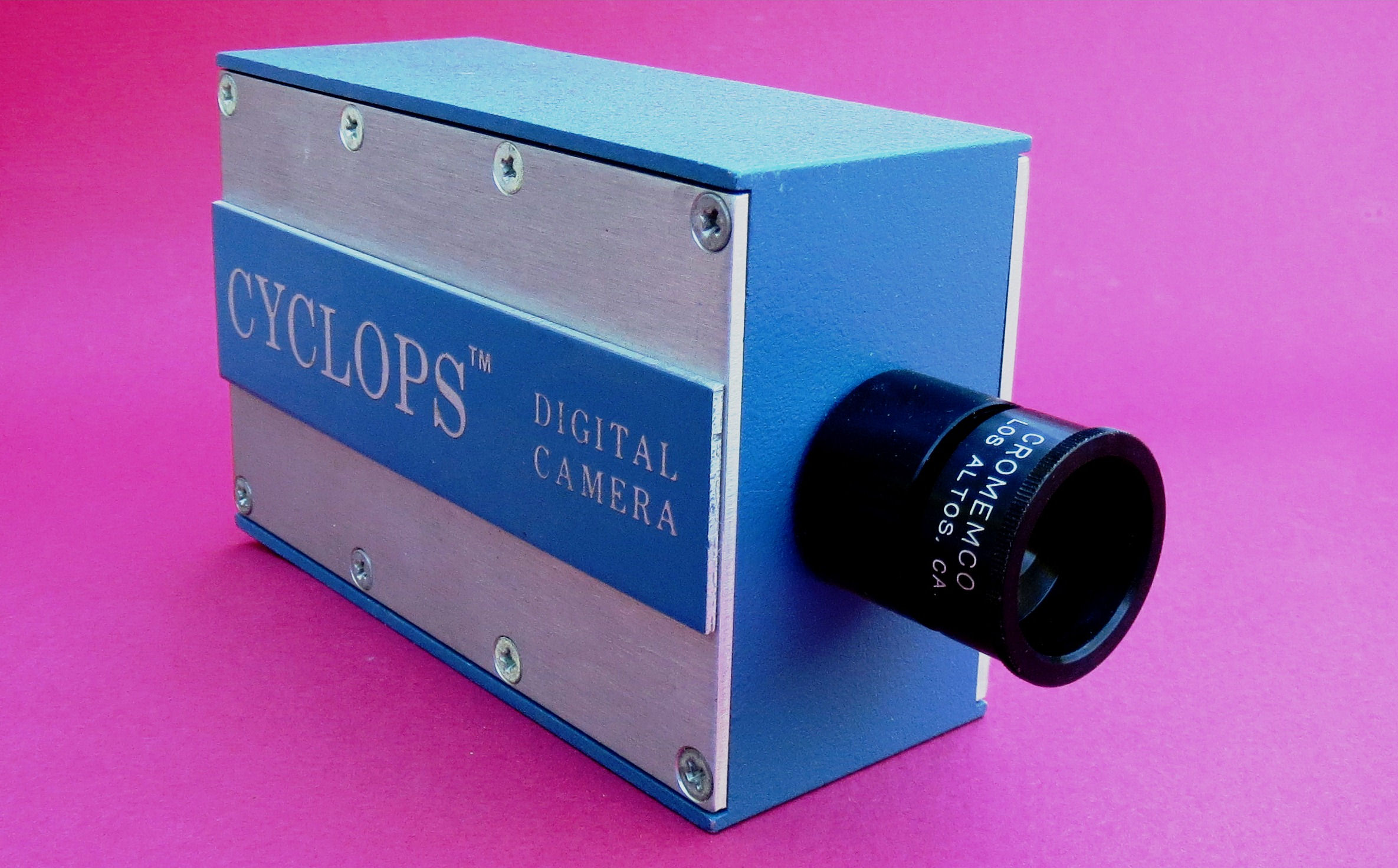
- First all-digital solid-state camera.

Overview
- Maker: Cromemco
- Released: 1975

Lens
- Lens mount: D-mount
- Lens: 25mm f2.8

Sensor/medium
- Sensor: modified 1kb RAM IC
- Sensor type: digital
- Maximum resolution: 32 × 32 pixels, 4 bits per pixel

Shutter
- Frame rate: 30 Hz

The Cromemco Cyclops, introduced in 1975 by Cromemco, was the first commercial all-digital camera using a digital metal–oxide–semiconductor (MOS) image sensor. It was also the first digital camera to be interfaced to a microcomputer. The digital sensor for the camera was a modified 1 kb dynamic RAM (DRAM) memory chip that offered a resolution of 32 × 32 pixels (0.001 megapixels).

== Background ==
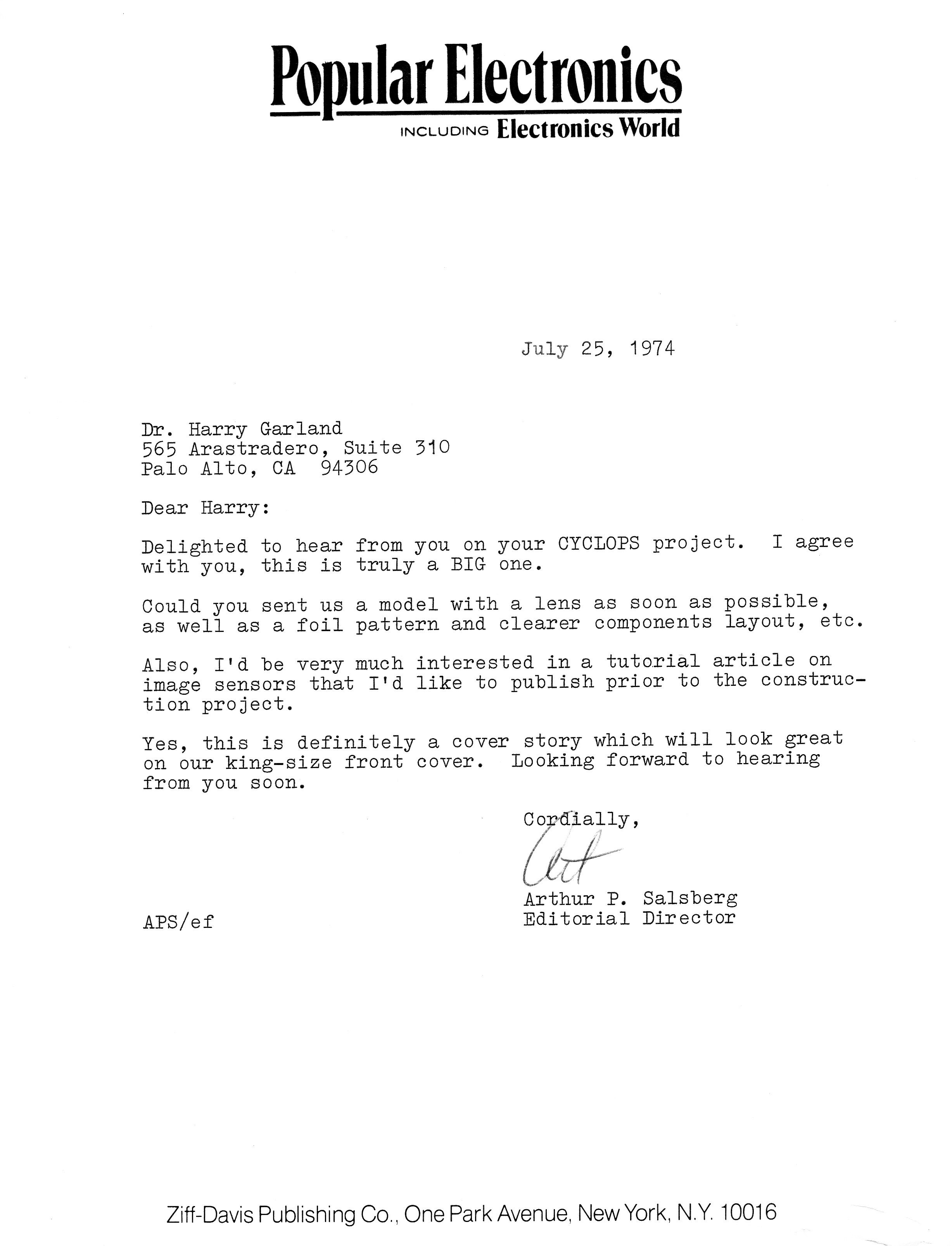
Correspondence from Popular Electronics, dated July 25, 1974, regarding a cover story for the Cyclops camera project.

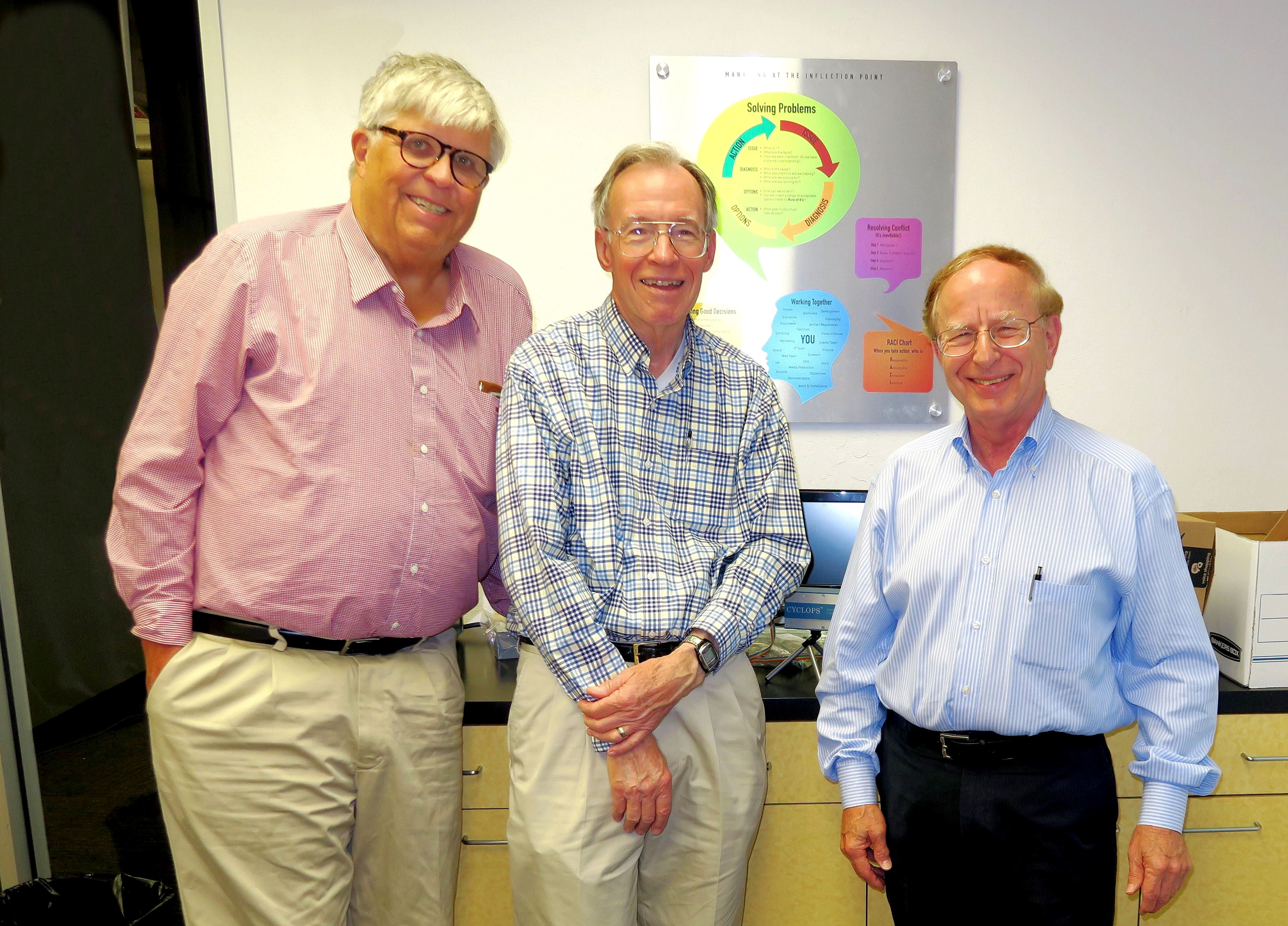
Roger Melen, Terry Walker, and Harry Garland (shown in 2017) co-authored the 1975 Cyclops article for Popular Electronics.

The Cyclops Camera was developed by Terry Walker, Harry Garland, and Roger Melen, and introduced as a hobbyist construction project in the February 1975 issue of Popular Electronics magazine.

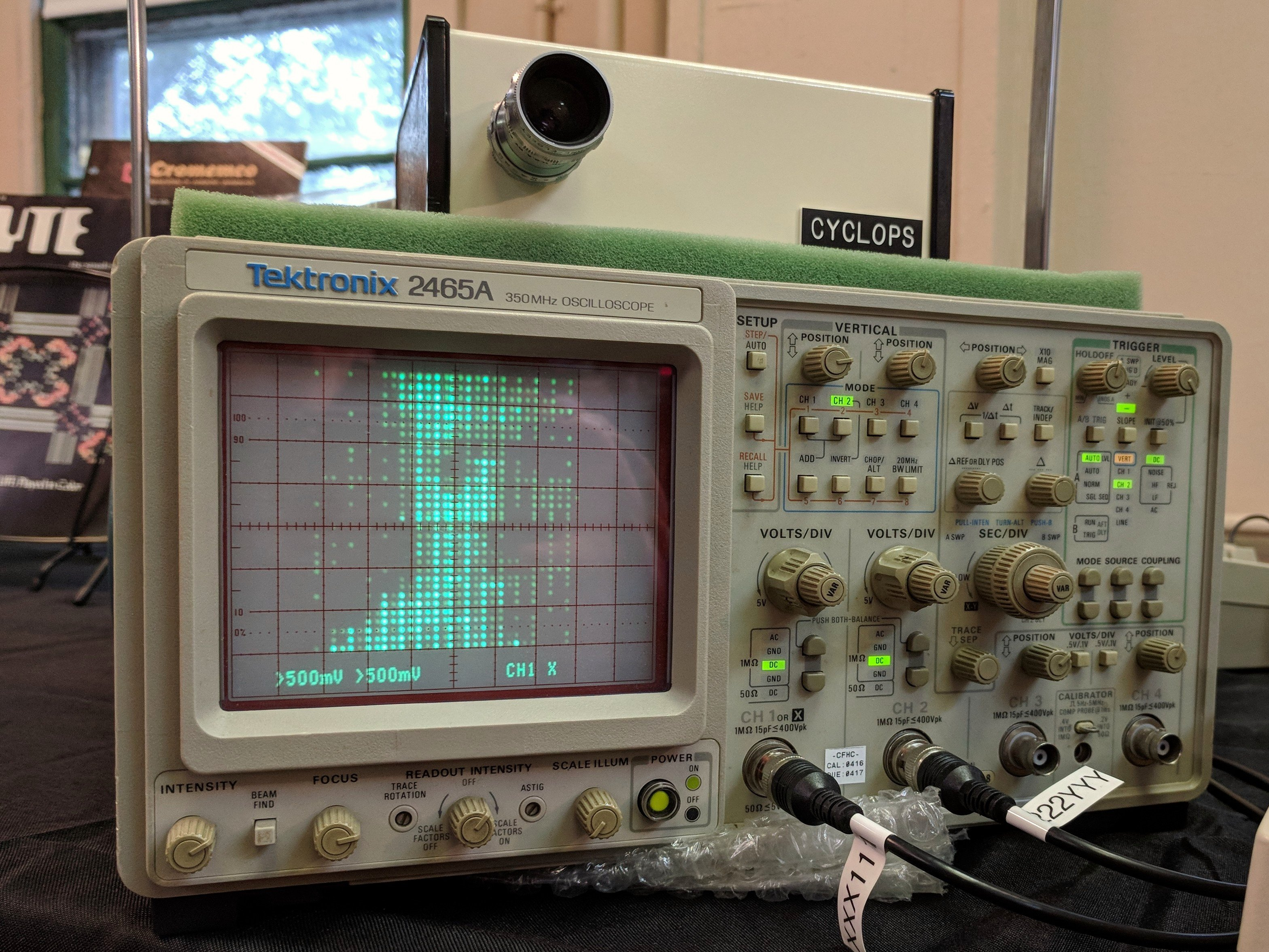
The 32x32 image output from the Cyclops camera displayed on an oscilloscope in XY mode

One month earlier the MITS Altair 8800 microcomputer had been introduced in this same magazine. Les Solomon, technical editor of Popular Electronics, saw the value of interfacing the Cyclops to the Altair, and put Roger Melen (co-developer of the Cyclops) in contact with Ed Roberts (president of MITS) to discuss a collaboration.

Roger Melen met with Ed Roberts at MITS headquarters in Albuquerque, New Mexico. Roberts encouraged Melen to interface the Cyclops to the Altair, promising to ship Melen an early Altair computer so that he and his colleagues could begin work on this project.

Roger Melen formed a partnership with Harry Garland to produce the Cyclops Camera, and other products for the Altair computer. They named their new venture "Cromemco" after the Stanford University dormitory (Crothers Memorial Hall) where they both had lived as graduate students. In January 1976 MITS introduced the Cromemco Cyclops Camera as the first peripheral for the Altair Computer.

== Technology ==
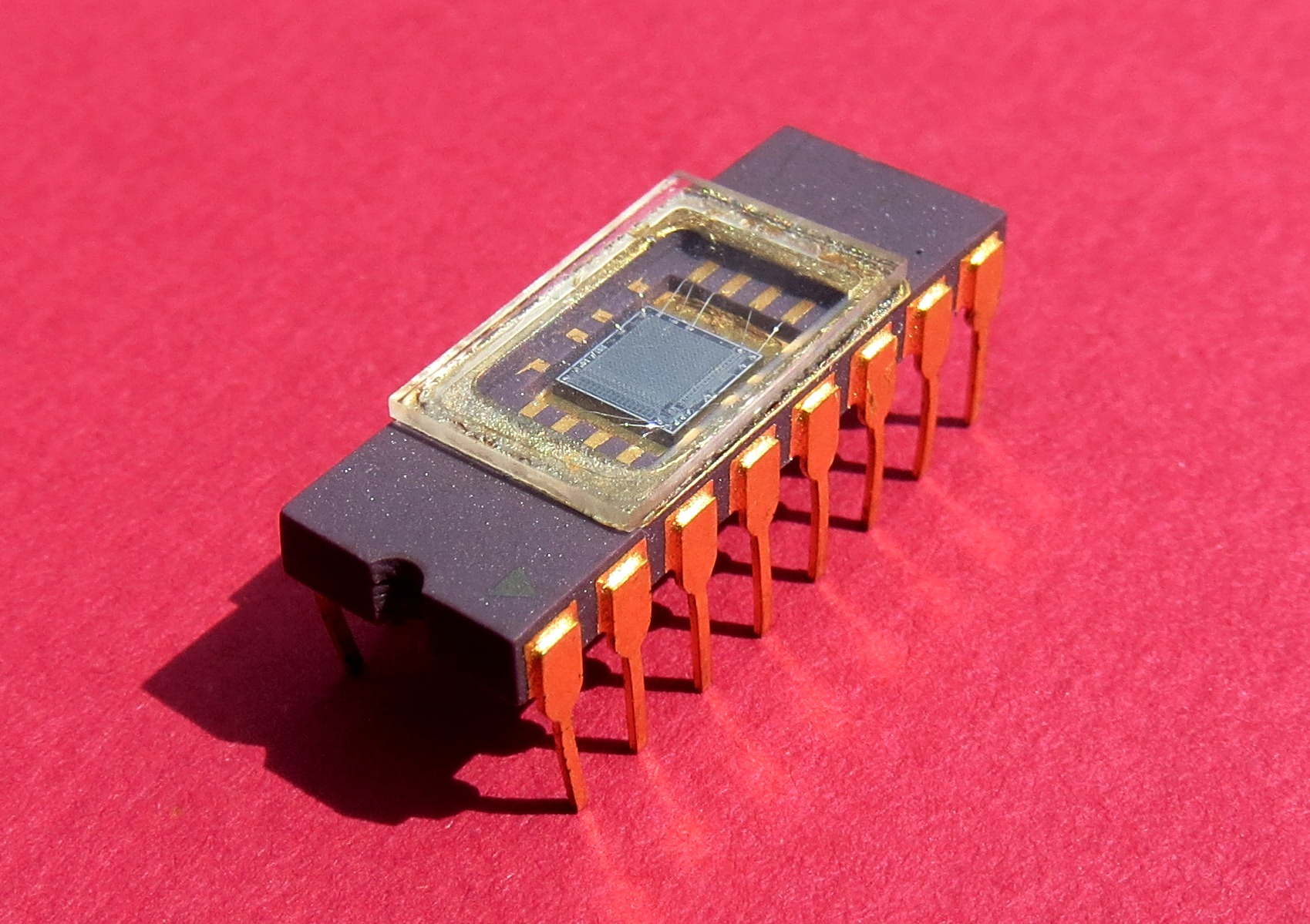
Cromemco 1024-element image sensor used in the Cyclops Camera.

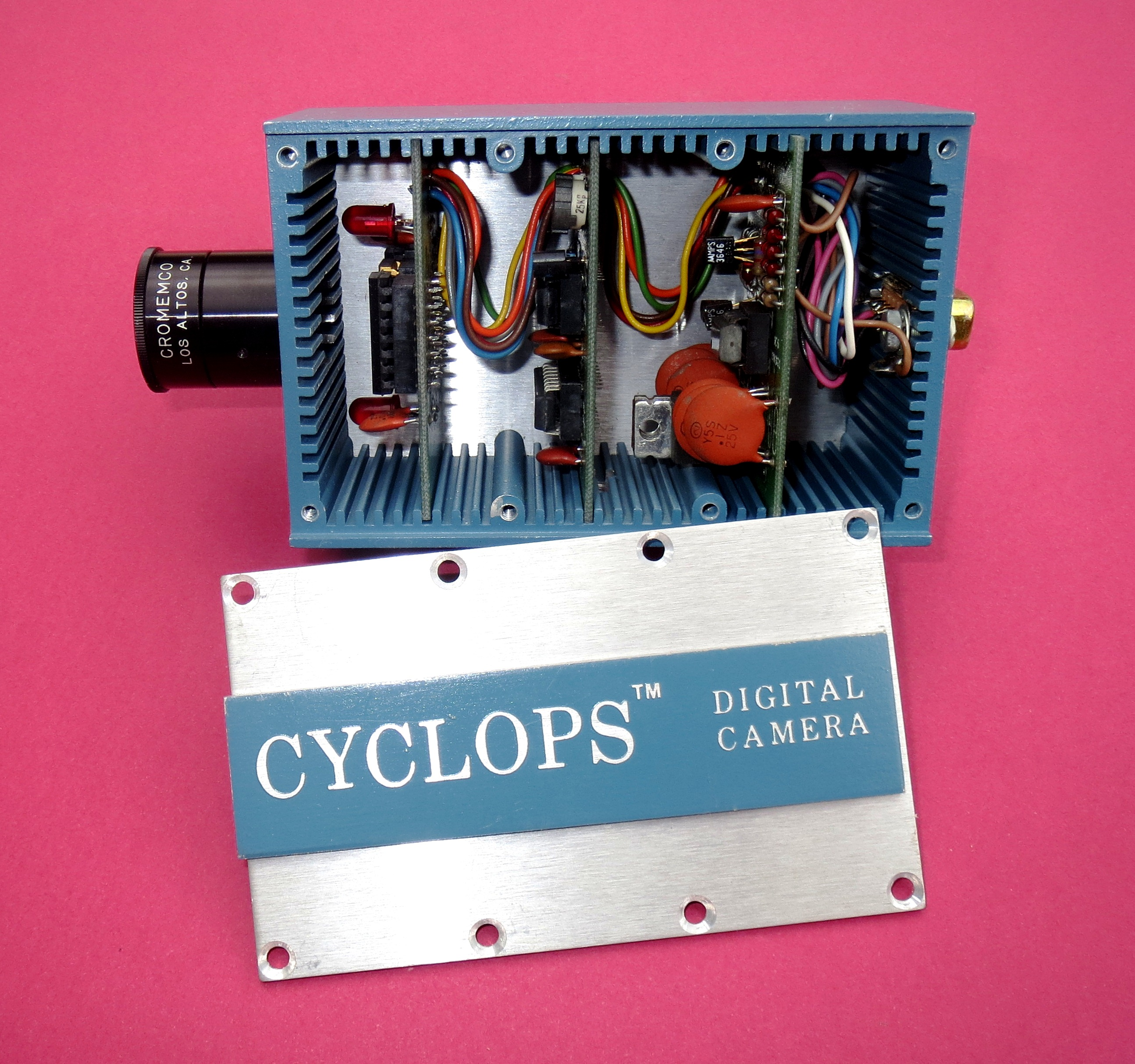
The electronics for the Cyclops was contained on three small circuit boards. The two red LED's on the first board are the bias lights to provide background illumination of the sensor for low-light conditions.

The Cyclops Camera used an innovative image sensor that was actually a modified MOS computer memory chip. The opaque cover on the chip was removed and replaced with a glass lid. The theory of operation was described in the original Popular Electronics article. Initially the 1024 memory locations, which were arranged in a 32 × 32 array, were filled with all 1s. Light shining on these memory cells would cause their contents to change to 0s. The stronger the light, the more quickly a cell would change from 1 to 0.

The Cyclops used a 25mm f2.8 D-mount lens to focus an image on the sensor array. The memory array was scanned once to store all 1’s in the memory elements. This was quickly followed by a series of 15 read-out scans. The cells that had the most incident light (i.e. the brightest parts of the picture) changed from 1 to 0 the soonest. Cells with little or no incident light (i.e. the darkest areas of the picture) would not change at all. So with a series of scans the Cyclops could produce a digital, gray-scale representation of the image.

The Cyclops also had two bias lights that could be used to increase its sensitivity in low-light environments. These lights could be adjusted either manually or under computer control to shine a uniform, low level of light on the sensor. Once adjusted, the Cyclops would then be sensitive to even the smallest amount of incident light from an image, even in low-light situations.

== Legacy ==
Today solid-state digital cameras are ubiquitous. A high-resolution digital camera sensor today (2019) may contain 40 million sensor elements (40 megapixels) which is 40,000 times more than the 0.001 megapixel sensor of the Cyclops.
