= Cromemco =

American microcomputer company

Cromemco, Inc.
- Logo used from 1974 to 1983
- Industry: Computer Manufacturing
- Founded: Los Altos, California (1974; 52 years ago)
- Founder: Harry Garland, President; Roger Melen, VP R&D
- Fate: Sold to Dynatech Corporation in 1987
- Successor: Dynatech Computer Systems
- Headquarters: Mountain View, California
- Key people: Chuck Bush, VP Manufacturing; Andy Procassini, VP Marketing; Mike Ramelot, VP Finance; Brent Gammon, General Counsel
- Products: Microcomputers

Cromemco, Inc. was a Mountain View, California microcomputer company known for its high-end Z80-based S-100 bus computers and peripherals in the early days of the personal computer revolution.

The company began as a partnership in 1974 between Harry Garland and Roger Melen, two Stanford Ph.D. students. The company was named for their residence at Stanford University (Crothers Memorial, a Stanford dormitory reserved for engineering graduate students). Cromemco was incorporated in 1976 and their first products were the Cromemco Cyclops digital camera, and the Cromemco Dazzler color graphics interface - both groundbreaking at the time - before they moved on to making computer systems.

In December 1981, Inc. magazine named Cromemco in the top ten fastest-growing privately held companies in the U.S. In 1987, it was acquired by Dynatech Corporation of Boston.

== Early history ==
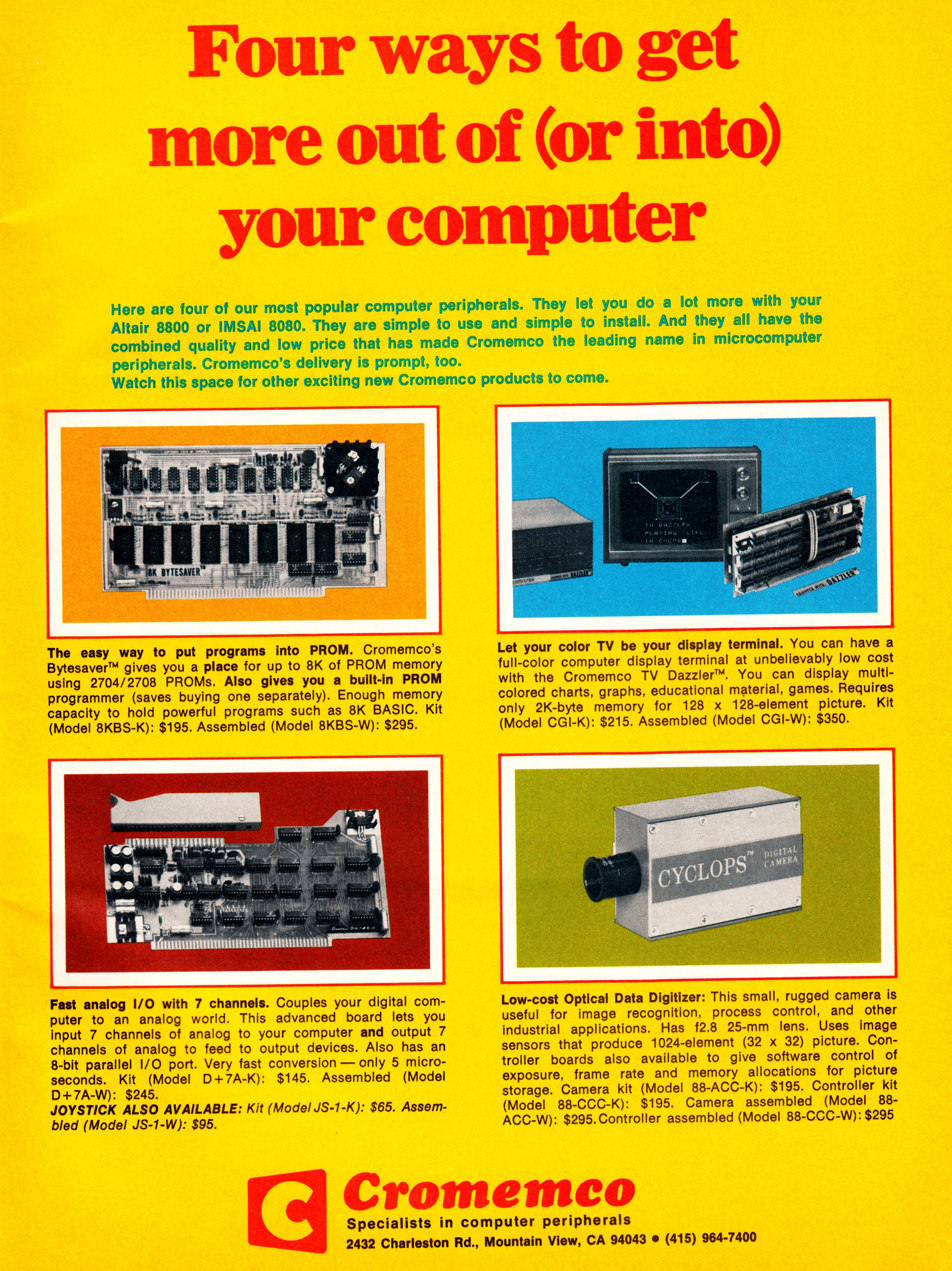
Cromemco advertisement on Page 1 of Byte Magazine, September 1976

The collaboration that was to become Cromemco began in 1970 when Harry Garland and Roger Melen, graduate students at Stanford University, began working on a series of articles for Popular Electronics magazine. These articles described construction projects for the electronic hobbyist. Since it was sometimes difficult for the hobbyist to find the needed parts for these projects, Garland and Melen licensed third-party suppliers to provide kits of parts. In 1973 a kit for one of these projects, an “Op Amp Tester”, was sold by a company called MITS which would later launch a revolutionary microcomputer on the cover of Popular Electronics.

In 1974, Roger Melen was visiting the New York editorial offices of Popular Electronics where he saw a prototype of the MITS Altair microcomputer. Melen was so impressed with this machine that he changed his return flight to California to go through Albuquerque, where he met with Ed Roberts, the president of MITS. At that meeting, Roberts encouraged Melen to develop add-on products for the Altair, beginning with the Cyclops digital camera that was slated to appear in the February 1975 issue of Popular Electronics.

On returning to California, Melen and Garland formed a partnership to produce the Cyclops camera and future microcomputer products. They named the company “Cromemco” after the Stanford dorm (Crothers Memorial Hall) where they first began their collaboration.

== First products ==
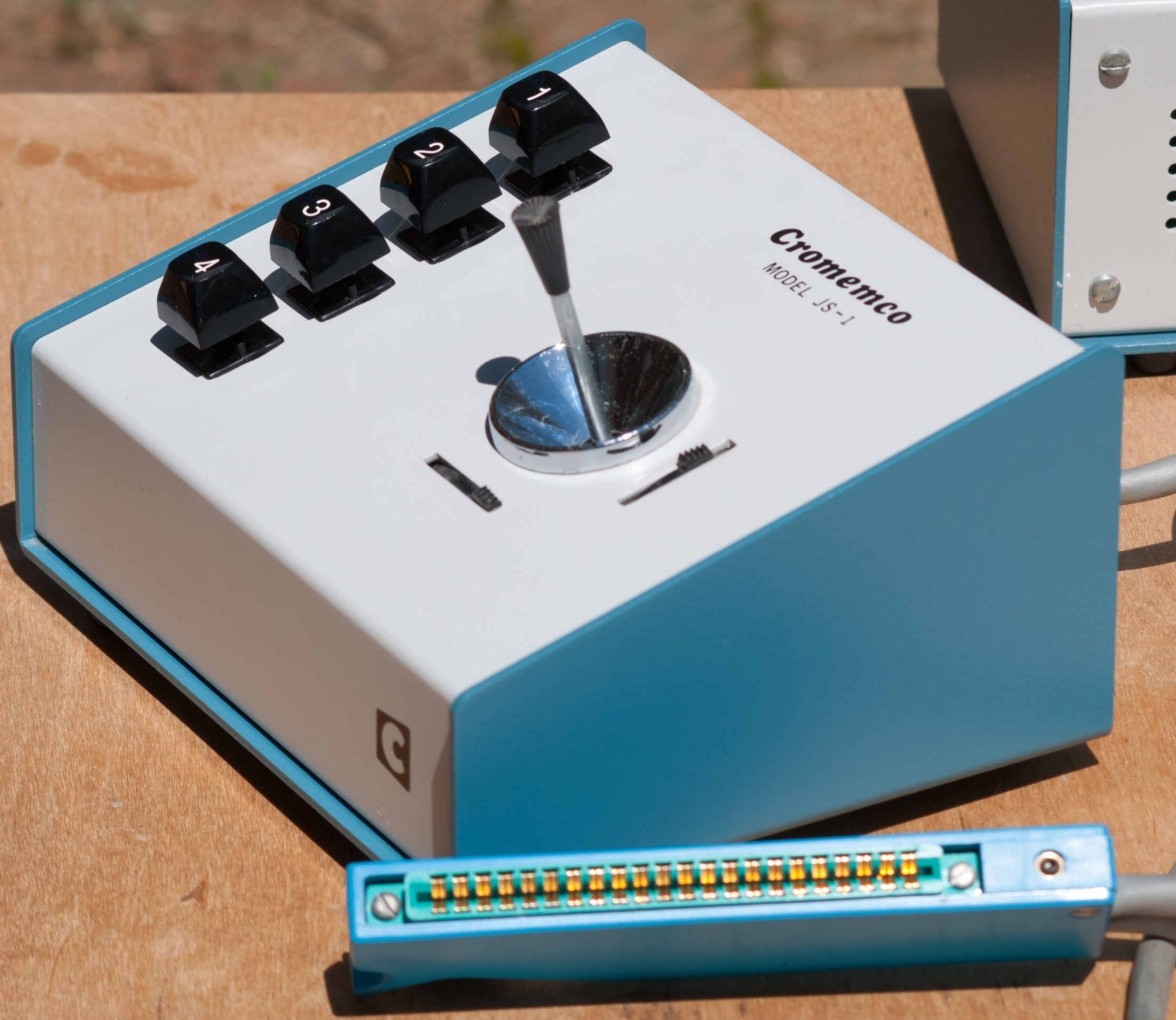
Cromemco JS-1 analog joystick console

Melen and Garland began work on the Cyclops Camera interface for the Altair, and this spawned several other projects for their young company. There was no convenient way to store software for the Altair, other than on punched paper tape. To remedy this problem Melen and Garland went to work on designing a programmable read-only memory card they called the “Bytesaver.” The Bytesaver also could support a resident program that allowed the computer to function immediately when it was powered up, without having to first manually load a bootstrap program. The Bytesaver proved to be a very popular peripheral.

There was also no way to see a Cyclops image stored in the Altair. So work began on a graphics interface card which could connect the Altair to a color TV set. This graphics interface, called the Dazzler, was introduced in the February 1976 issue of Popular Electronics.

One use for an Altair Computer with a Dazzler was to play games. But there was no way to interface a game console or joystick to the Altair. So the next project was to design a joystick console and an interface card that supported an 8-bit digital channel and seven analog channels (called the D+7A). The D+7A could do much more than just interface a joystick, however, and it was this card that allowed the Altair to be connected to the world of data acquisition and industrial computing.

Cromemco called themselves “Specialists in Computer Peripherals” and had a reputation for innovative designs and quality construction. They were, however, just a few steps away from offering their own computer system based on the Altair computer bus structure, named by Garland and Melen the "S-100 bus".

== From boards to systems ==
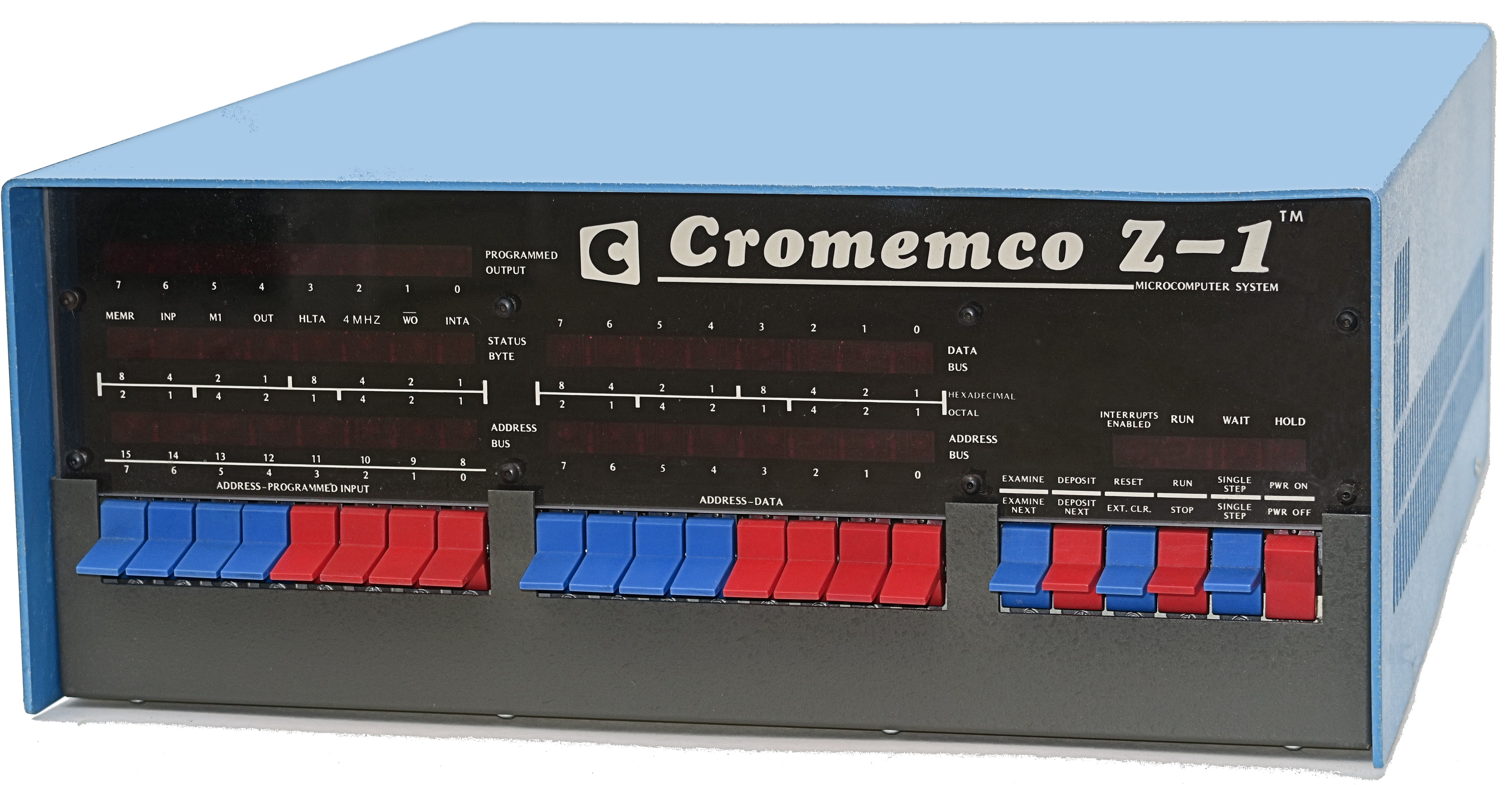
Cromemco Z-1 (1976)

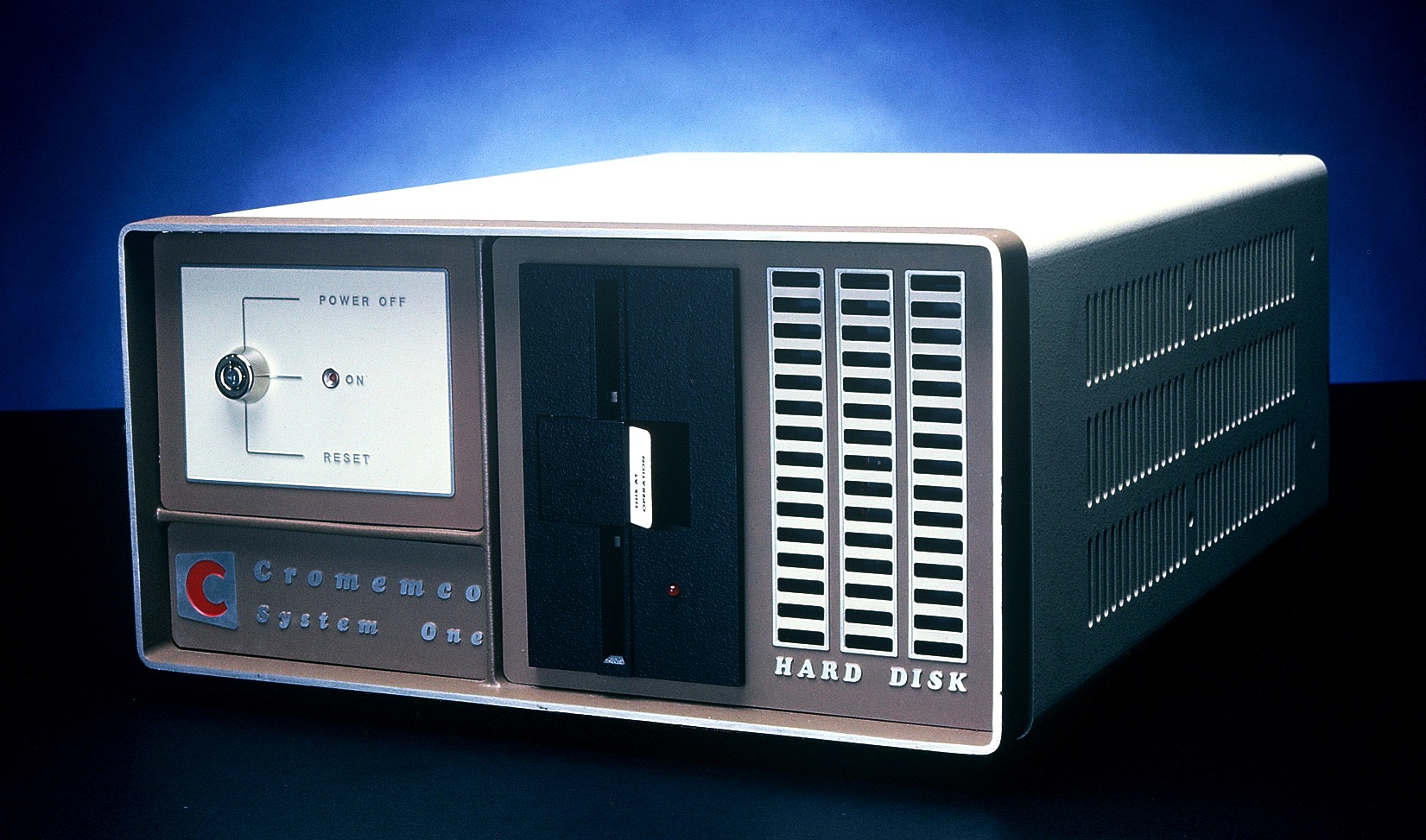
Cromemco System One (CS-1H) 1981

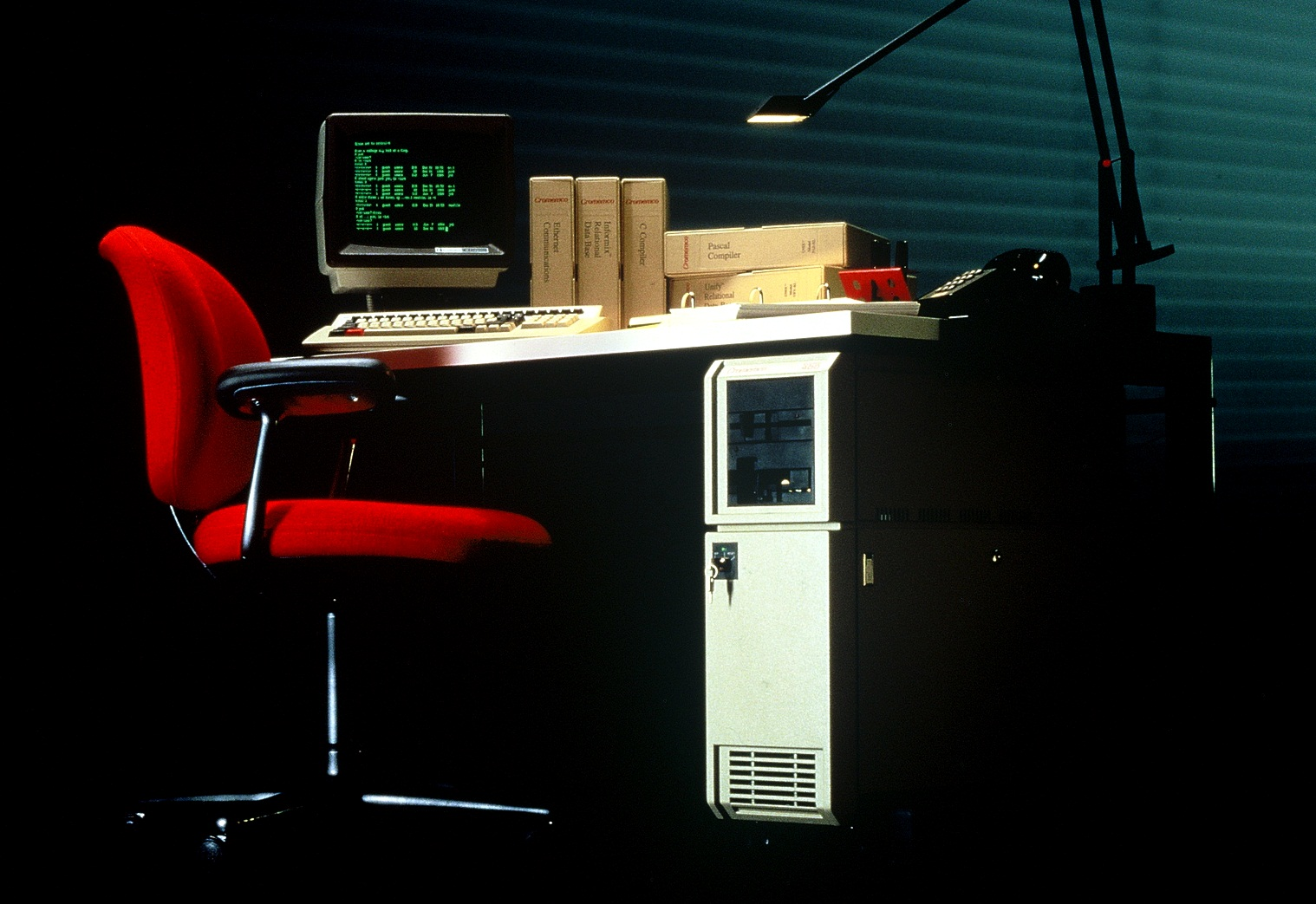
Cromemco System 400 32-bit Super Microcomputer with XXU (1985)

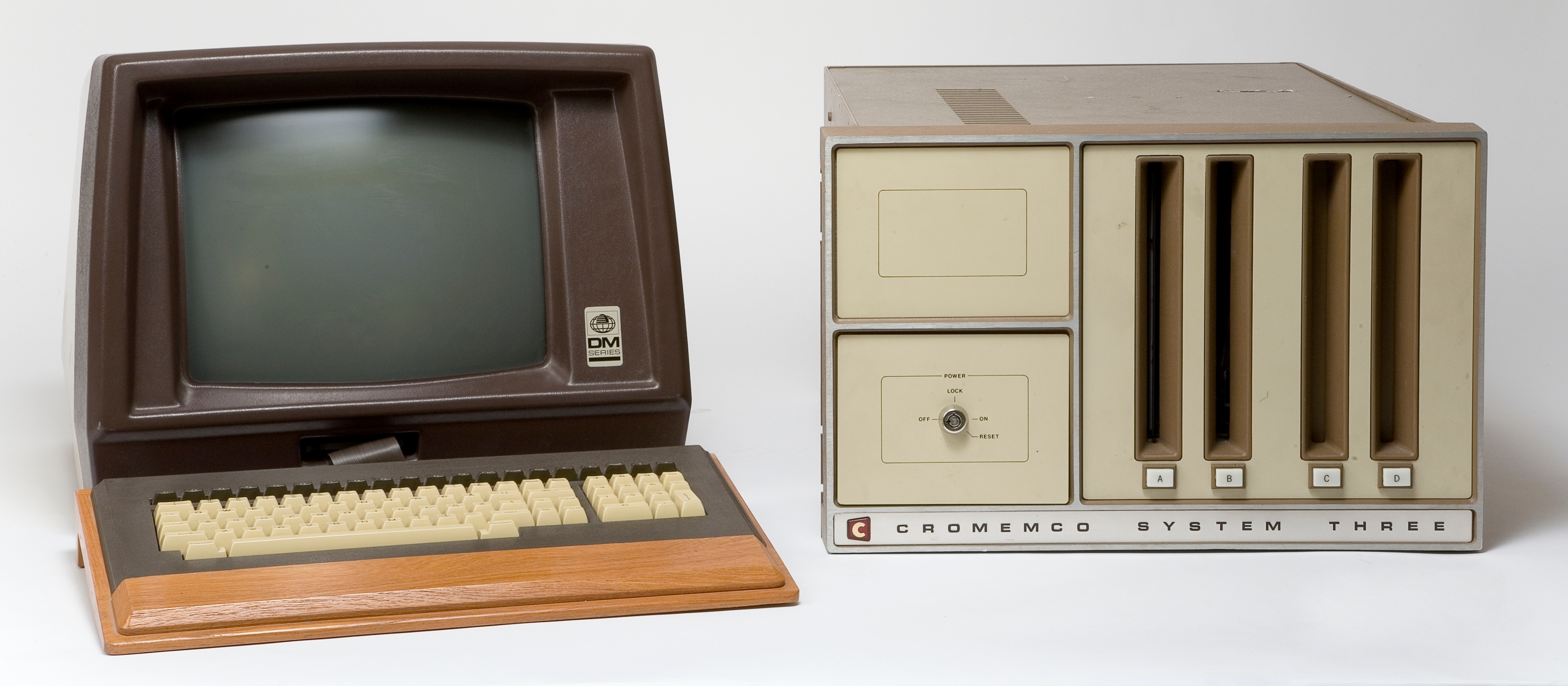
Cromemco System Three (1978)

The first computer released by Cromemco was the Z-1 in August 1976. The Z-1 came with 8K of static RAM and used the same chassis as the IMSAI 8080 but featured the Z80 microprocessor rather than the IMSAI computer's Intel 8080 chip. The Z-1 was succeeded by the Z-2 in June 1977, which featured 64K of RAM and the ability to run Cromemco DOS (CDOS), a CP/M-like operating system. The Z-2 also added a parallel interface in addition to an RS-232C serial port and no longer included the large panel of switches that had been part of the Z-1 model.

Cromemco re-packaged their systems to produce the System One, followed by the larger System Two and System Three. The System Three, announced in 1978 was capable of running both FORTRAN IV and Z80 BASIC programming languages. The System Three was designed for multiuser professional use and included an optional hard disk, CRT terminal, printer and the main computer unit.

Cromemco sold two operating systems: CDOS, which was very much like CP/M, and CROMIX, Cromemco's own multi-user Unix-like OS.

CROMIX used banked memory, and with 448k installed, could support up to 6 users (1 bank for the system, and 1 bank for each user). CROMIX was released in 1979.

CROMIX initially ran on the System Three and would later run on Cromemco systems using the Motorola 68000 series of microprocessors.

Cromemco S-100 Microcomputer Systems (Z80 Processor)
System	Year Introduced	S-100 slots	Internal Floppy Disk	Internal Hard Disk	Operating systems
Z-1	1976	21	—N/a	—N/a	
Z-2	1977	21	—N/a	—N/a	CP/M
System Zero	1980	4	—N/a	—N/a	CP/M, Cromix
System One CS-1	1981	8	2 x 5-inch	—N/a	CP/M, Cromemco DOS, Cromix
System One CS-1H	1981	8	1 x 5-inch	5 megabytes	CP/M, Cromemco DOS, Cromix
System Two Z-2D	1978	21	2 x 5-inch	—N/a	CP/M, Cromemco DOS, Cromix
System Two Z-2H	1980	12	2 x 5-inch	11 megabytes	CP/M, Cromemco DOS, Cromix
System Three	1978	21	4 x 8-inch	—N/a	CP/M, Cromemco DOS, Cromix

In 1982, Cromemco introduced a Motorola 68000 CPU card for their systems. It was a dual-processor card (called the DPU) with both a Motorola 68000 processor and a Zilog Z80 processor (for backward compatibility). Their System One, Two, and Three computers evolved to the 100-series, 200-series, and 300-series respectively. Additionally a 400-series was introduced in a tower-style case. The DPU was followed by the increasing capable XPU and XXU cards also based on the Motorola 68000 family of processors.

Cromemco also introduced the C-10 personal computer in 1982, a Z80 floppy disk based system for the low end of the market. It ran CDOS and came with several business software tools such as a spreadsheet, a word processor, and the BASIC programming language.

Cromemco S-100 Central Processor Units
Cromemco CPU Card	Year Introduced	Microprocessor	Clock Rate	Performance (in Whetstones)
ZPU	1976	Z80A	2 MHz/4 MHz (switch selectable)	7,000
DPU	1982	Z80A/MC68000	4 MHz/8 MHz	40,000
XPU	1984	Z80B/MC68010	5 Mz/10 MHz	50,000
XXU	1986	MC68020 with MC68881	16.7 MHz	1,050,000

Wordmark used from 1983 to present

By 1983, Cromemco employed over 500 people, had annual revenues of US$55 million, and had sold more S-100 based computer systems than any other company. The company was wholly owned by Garland and Melen until it was sold to Dynatech Corporation in 1987. Dynatech was a major customer of Cromemco computers through its subsidiary ColorGraphics Weather Systems. The European division of Cromemco reorganized as Cromemco AG and was in liquidation in 2018. The Cromemco operation in Greece, founded in 1978 as Information Systems & Control Ltd., was continuing to operate as Cromemco Hellas S.A. as of 2026.

== Engineering contributions ==
Cromemco was known for its engineering, design, and system reliability. Cromemco’s engineering firsts for microcomputer systems include the first digital camera (the Cyclops Camera), the first color graphics card (the Cromemco Dazzler), the first programmable storage (the Bytesaver), the first memory bank switching, and the first commercially available Unix-like operating system (Cromix).

Cromemco drew on engineering talent from Stanford University, the Homebrew Computer Club, and even its own distributors. Joe McCrate, Curt Terwilliger, Tom McCalmont, Jerry May, Herb Lewis, and Marvin Kausch had all been students of the company founders at Stanford University. Ed Hall and Li-Chen Wang came to Cromemco through the Homebrew Computer Club. Nik Ivancic, Boris Krtolica, and Egon Zakrajšek joined from Cromemco’s distributor in Yugoslavia where they had developed structural engineering software for Cromemco systems.

Several Cromemco engineers went on to found other Silicon Valley companies. Roger Sippl, Laura King, and Roy Harrington formed Informix Corporation. Tom McCalmont founded REgrid Power Inc. and later McCalmont Engineering. Jeff Johnson went on to found UI Wizards, Inc. and publish best-selling books on software user-interface design.

== Notable installations ==
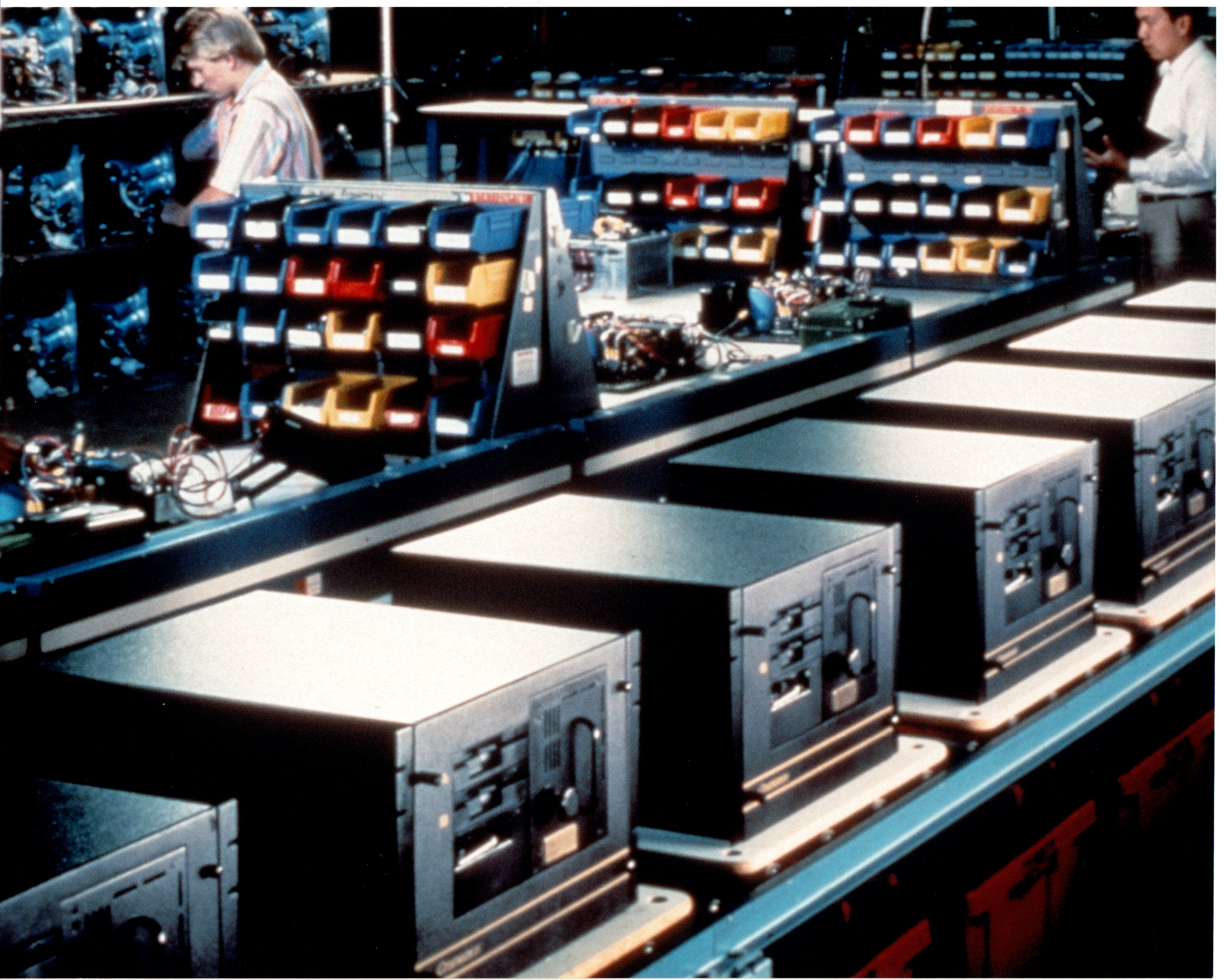
Cromemco production line of CS-250 computers for USAF Mission Support System (1986)

In 1981, a study was commissioned by the United States Air Force Systems Command to select a microcomputer for the Theater Air Control System (TACS). From a field of 149 microcomputers the Final Technical Report concluded that “the equipment offered by Cromemco is the most responsive to the general selection criteria.” In the years following this study the United States Air Force became a major customer for Cromemco computers.

Cromemco developed a special version of the CS-200 computer (called the CS-250) to meet the requirements of the Air Force's Mission Support System (MSS). The CS-250 had a removable hard disk based on patented Cromemco technology. The United States Air Force deployed 600 Cromemco Systems from 1985 to 1996 as Mission Support Systems for the F-15, F-16, and F-111 aircraft. These systems received their first war time use in Operation Desert Storm in 1991.

The United States Navy deployed Cromemco computers aboard ships and Ohio-class submarines, and to generate speech output for the Aegis Combat System in the Combat Information Center.

Cromemco systems were also widely used in commercial applications, including at the Chicago Mercantile Exchange (CME) where a bank of 60 Cromemco Z-2 systems were used to process trades. Each Z-2 system was populated with Cromemco Octart interface cards, with each card supporting eight terminals on the trading floor. For ten years, from 1982 to 1992, all trades at the CME were processed by these systems. In 1992 the Cromemco systems were replaced by IBM PS/2 computers.

Cromemco computers were the first microcomputer systems widely distributed in China. In 1985 Newsweek reported that over 10,000 Cromemco computer systems had been sold to Chinese universities.

Cromemco systems were also broadly adopted by U.S. television stations for generating weather and art graphics, using software developed by ColorGraphics Weather Systems. By 1986 more than 80 percent of the major-market television stations in the U.S. used Cromemco systems to produce news and weather graphics.

== In popular culture ==
In 1984, the Cromemco System One Computer appeared in the movie Ghostbusters as a computer in the Ghostbuster Laboratory.

In 2011, Paul Allen commented on the Cromemco Cyclops Camera in his book, Idea Man: a memoir by the cofounder of Microsoft, noting that "The Altair even debuted a digital camera back in 1976."

In 2011, Mona Simpson revealed, in a eulogy for her brother Steve Jobs, that she had considered buying a Cromemco as her first computer.

In 2013, the Cromemco System Three Computer appeared prominently in Andrew Bujalski's film Computer Chess.

In 2013, Deborah Perry Piscione in her New York Times best-selling book, Secrets of Silicon Valley, identified Cromemco, along with Apple Inc., as the two Silicon Valley companies that created the personal computer industry.

In 2018, the Cromemco C-10 computer was added to the collection of the Smithsonian National Museum of American History.

== See also ==
- Cromemco Bytesaver EPROM programmer/memory card
- Cromemco CYCLOPS digital camera
- Cromemco Dazzler video card
- Cromemco 4FDC 4 channel floppy controller card
- Cromemco IOP input / output processor
- Cromemco CSP c-bus interface card
- Cromemco TDS tape interface card
- Cromemco TUART 2 channel serial interface card
- Cromemco QUADART 4 channel serial interface card
- Cromemco OCTART 8 channel serial interface card
- Cromemco Z-2
- DNIX
- Dataindustrier AB
- Homebrew Computer Club
- S-100 bus
