= Roger Melen =

American businessman (born 1946)

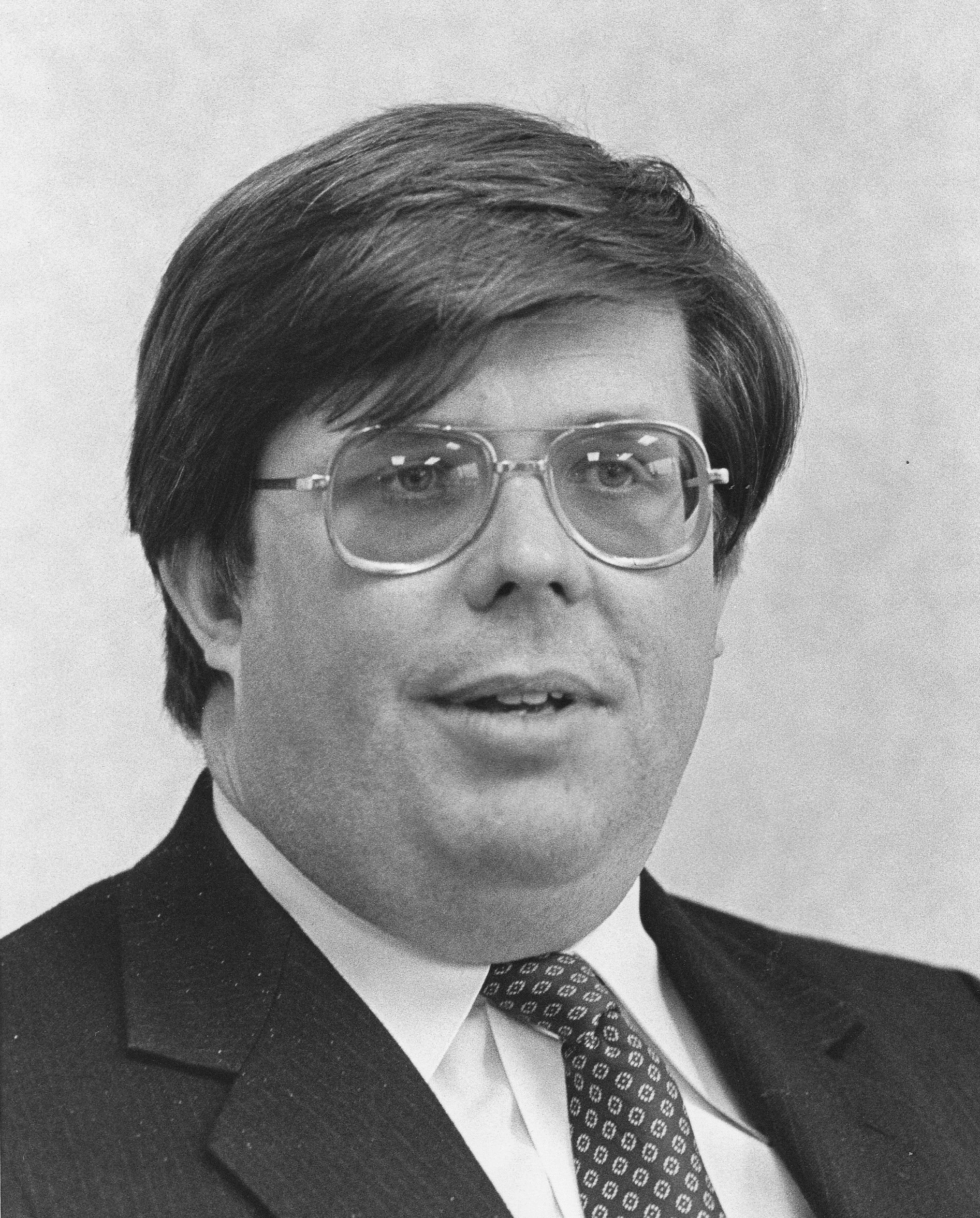
- Melen in 1986
- Born: 1946
- Education: Chico State College; Stanford University; Stanford University
- Occupations: Electrical engineer, businessman
- Call sign: WB6JXU

Roger Douglas Melen (1946 – ?) was an American electrical engineer recognized for his early contributions to the microcomputer industry, and for his technical innovations.

Dr. Melen was co-founder of Cromemco, one of the earliest microcomputer companies. At Cromemco he developed color graphics systems that were widely used in television broadcast, and in mission planning systems deployed by the United States Air Force. He also developed the first microcomputer systems widely distributed in China. In addition to his work in microcomputer systems and color graphics, Dr. Melen has made significant technical contributions to the development of CCD image sensors, ultrasonic imaging systems, implantable cochlear devices, image processing technology, and vehicular information systems.

He has been recognized as one of the most important inventors and innovators in the history of Silicon Valley.

== Early contributions ==
As a young man, Roger Melen enjoyed ham radio, operating an amateur radio station from his home in Chico, California under the call sign WB6JXU. He attended Chico State College where he received the BSEE degree in 1968. His first published invention, an audio filter he called the "Beatnote Basher", appeared in the amateur radio publication 73 Magazine in 1969. Melen attended graduate school at Stanford University, and there he continued to design projects for the electronic hobbyist, collaborating with a fellow graduate student, Harry Garland, on a series of inventions published as construction projects in Popular Electronics magazine. He received the MSEE degree from Stanford in 1969, and the Ph.D. degree in 1973. Melen was invited to join the research staff of the Stanford Integrated Circuits Laboratory in 1972, and was named Associate Director of the laboratory in 1974. Recognizing that charge-coupled device (CCD) technology had greater potential than MOS technology in delivering "full video quality imaging" for solid-state image sensors he worked on the development of CCD image sensors for application to the Optacon reading machine for the blind. He also applied CCD technology to medical ultrasonic imaging systems, and worked on the development of an implantable cochlear device for the profoundly deaf.

He also continued to write for Popular Electronics magazine, which resulted in a meeting in Albuquerque, New Mexico that would change the course of his career. In 1974, he submitted a design for a digital camera, called the "Cyclops", to Popular Electronics. While visiting the editorial office of Popular Electronics in New York to discuss the Cyclops, Melen saw a prototype of the MITS Altair Computer that was also being readied for publication. Recognizing the potential of interfacing the Cyclops digital camera to the Altair, Melen changed his return flight to California to go through Albuquerque to visit Ed Roberts, president of MITS. Roberts was anxious to develop third-party support for the Altair, and encouraged Melen to interface the Cyclops digital camera to the Altair computer. Roberts agreed to ship an Altair computer to Melen so that he could get to work on the interface.

== Cromemco ==
The MITS Altair Computer appeared on the cover of Popular Electronics in January 1975, and the Cyclops digital camera appeared on the front cover the following month. Melen went to work on an interface to connect the Cyclops to the Altair. To market the Cyclops Camera, and its Altair interface, Melen formed a company with Harry Garland; they named the company "Cromemco" after "Crothers Memorial Hall", the name of the Stanford dormitory where they both had lived as graduate students. The MITS Altair was an immediate success, and this provided an opportunity for Cromemco to develop other products.

The next product developed by Melen was a color graphics interface for the Altair, called the "Dazzler". The Dazzler appeared on the front cover of the February 1976 issue of Popular Electronics. Melen and his team developed a series of other products culminating in the introduction of complete computer systems based on the Zilog Z80 microprocessor, and later the Motorola 68000 processor. These systems were used for graphics generation in U.S. television stations, were widely deployed as Mission Planning Systems by the United States Air Force, and were the first microcomputer systems widely distributed in China. Dr. Melen served as Vice President of R&D for Cromemco from its inception in 1975 to its sale to Dynatech Corporation in 1987.

== Further contributions ==
Melen served as Vice President of R&D for Canon Research Center of America from its inception in 1990 until 2001. During this time he developed image processing technology for document imaging, stereographic photography, and radiographic imaging. In 2001, Melen joined Toyota InfoTechnology Center, U.S.A. as Senior Advisor. At Toyota he has focused on developing technology for vehicular information systems in support of vehicle safety and efficiency.

== Recognition ==
Melen served as Editor of Charge-Coupled Devices: Technology and Applications published by the IEEE Press. He is also co-author of two other technical books: Understanding IC Operational Amplifiers, and Understanding CMOS Integrated Circuits. His role as a pioneer in the microcomputer industry has been recognized in numerous books, and by his appearance in the 1996 PBS documentary, The Triumph of the Nerds: The Rise of Accidental Empires. Dr. Melen has been awarded 70 patents by the U.S. Patent Office.
