= David Packard Medal of Achievement =

Award presented by the California Technology Council

David Packard Medal of Achievement (formerly AeA Medal of Achievement) is presented by the California Technology Council. The Medal was previously presented by TechAmerica (formerly AeA), between 1959 and the ultimate closure and breakup of TechAmerica in 2013. An award dinner is held to honor the current recipient and to hear from a variety of those influenced by the honoree, including an expression of their impact on the technology industry. This award is the highest award bestowed by the California Technology Council.

An example of what the new David Packard Medal of Achievement might look like.

== Recipients ==
Recipients are selected for their contributions to technology, community, and humankind.

Year	Recipient	Company
1959	H. Leslie Hoffman	Hoffman Radio
	Richard L. Paullus	WEMA
1960	David Packard	Hewlett-Packard Company
1961	Arnold O. Beckman	Beckman Instruments
1962	Daniel E. Noble	Motorola
1963	Frederick E. Terman	Stanford University
1964	Howard Vollum	Tektronix, Inc.
1965	Charles B. Thornton	Litton Industries, Inc.
1966	Sigurd Varian	Varian Associates, Inc.
	Russell H. Varian	Varian Associates, Inc.
1967	Lawrence A. Hyland	Hughes Aircraft
1968	Alexander M. Poniatoff	Ampex Corporation
1969	John R. Moore	Rockwell International
	Lee A. DuBridge	California Institute of Technology
1970	Simon Ramo	TRW
1971	William R. Hewlett	Hewlett-Packard Company
1972	Patrick E. Haggerty	Texas Instruments, Inc.
1973	John S. Foster	U.S. Department of Defense
1974	Robert N. Noyce	Intel Corporation
1975	William H. Pickering	Jet Propulsion Laboratory
1976	John M. Fluke	John Fluke Manufacturing
1977	Arthur A. Collins	Collins Radio
1978	C. Lester Hogan	Fairchild Camera & Instrument
1979	William C. Norris	Control Data Corporation
1980	William J. Perry	U.S. Department of Defense
1981	Kenneth H. Olsen	Digital Equipment Corporation
1982	Frank T. Cary	IBM Corporation
1983	John G. Linvill	Stanford University
1984	An Wang	Wang Laboratories
1985	E. E. Ferrey	American Electronics Association
1986	H. Ross Perot	Electronic Data Systems
1987	Thomas J. Davis, Jr.	Mayfield Fund
	Arthur Rock	Arthur Rock & Company
1988	Robert W. Galvin	Motorola
1989	Thomas J. Watson, Jr.	IBM Corporation
1990	John Young	Hewlett-Packard Company
1991	Ian Ross	AT&T Bell Laboratories
1992	Malcolm R. Currie	Hughes Aircraft
1993	Gordon E. Moore	Intel Corporation
	Andrew S. Grove	Intel Corporation
1994	Gary L. Tooker	Motorola
1995	J. Richard Iverson	American Electronics Association
1996	James F. Gibbons	Stanford University
1997	Ray Dolby	Dolby Laboratories, Inc.
1998	Dr. Irwin M. Jacobs	QUALCOMM, Inc.
1999	Lewis E. Platt	Hewlett-Packard Company
2000	Charles R. Trimble	Trimble Navigation Limited
2001	W. J. Sander III	Advanced Micro Devices
2002	Edward W. Barnholt	Agilent Technologies
2004	Richard M. Levy	Varian Medical Systems
2005	Thomas J. Engibous	Texas Instruments, Inc.
2006	Chuck Geschke	Adobe Systems
	John Warnock	Adobe Systems
2007	William T. Archey	AeA
2008	Paul S. Otellini	Intel Corporation
2009	John W. Thompson	Symantec Corporation
2010	Marc Benioff	Salesforce.com
2011	Ray Lane	Kleiner Perkins Caufield & Byers
2012	Reid Hoffman	Greylock Partners
