= Stanford University School of Engineering =

Engineering school within Stanford University

Stanford University School of Engineering is one of the schools of Stanford University. The current dean is Jennifer Widom, the former senior associate dean of faculty affairs and computer science chair. She is the school's 10th dean. The school includes departments of Aeronautics and astronautics; Bioengineering; Chemical engineering; Civil and environmental engineering; Computer science; Electrical engineering; Materials science and engineering; Management science and engineering; and Mechanical engineering.

== Organization and academics ==
The school of engineering was established in 1925, when Stanford organized the previously independent academic departments into a school. The original departments in the school were:

- Civil engineering, one of the original university departments (1891), later to become civil and environmental engineering
- Electrical engineering, taught as a subject prior to being established as a department in 1894
- Mechanical engineering, one of the original university departments (1891)
- Mining and metallurgy, established in 1918 and eventually disbanded in 1945

=== Departments added afterwards ===
- Aeronautics and astronautics, started as aeronautical engineering in 1958
- Chemical engineering in 1961 (split from chemistry)
- Computer science, established in 1965 in the school of humanities and sciences, but moved to the school of engineering in 1985
- Materials science and engineering in 1961 (originally known as materials science)
- Management science and engineering in the 1950s (originally industrial engineering)
- Bioengineering in 2002

=== Current departments at the school ===
- Aeronautics and astronautics
- Bioengineering (also in the School of Medicine)
- Chemical engineering
- Civil and environmental engineering
- Computer science
- Electrical engineering
- Materials science and engineering
- Management science and engineering
- Mechanical engineering

In addition, the Institute for Computational and Mathematical Engineering is an interdisciplinary program.

== List of deans ==
1. Theodore J. Hoover (1925–1936)
2. Samuel B. Morris (1936–1944)
3. Frederick E. Terman (1944–1958)
4. Joseph M. Pettit (1958–1972)
5. William M. Kays (1972–1984)
6. James F. Gibbons (1984–1996)
7. John L. Hennessy (1996–1999)
8. James D. Plummer (1999–2014)
9. Persis Drell (2014–2016)
10. Thomas Kenny (interim dean) (2016–2017)
11. Jennifer Widom (2017–current)

== Department of Electrical Engineering ==
The Stanford Department of Electrical Engineering, also known as EE; Double E, is a department at Stanford University. Established in 1894, it is one of nine engineering departments that comprise the school of engineering, and in 1971, had the largest graduate enrollment of any department at Stanford University. The department is currently located in the David Packard Building on Jane Stanford Way in Stanford, California.

=== History ===
==== Early developments (1800s–1940s) ====
Stanford University opened in 1891, and within the year, courses addressing topics such as electrical currents and magnetism were being taught by professors such as A.P. Carman. Professor Frederic A.C. Perrine was the first faculty to teach the subject of electrical engineering at Stanford, in 1893. In 1983, when F.A.C. Perrine was appointed Stanford's first professor of electrical engineering, the program focused on central generating plants for electricity. Frederic A.C. Perrine, in 1893, made an acknowledgement of gifts to Stanford's Electrical Engineering Department in The Stanford Daily, among them 30 horse power double reduction street-railroad motor, field magnets, and various machines from the General Electric Company and wires from American Electrical Works and New England Butt Company.

Prior to 1894, electrical engineering had been taught as part of the Physics and Mechanical Engineering curriculum. That year, the EE Department was established in the Engineering Labs. In 1894, the first undergraduate degree in electrical engineering was awarded to Lucien Howard Gilmore of Capron, Illinois.

In January 1894, the electrical engineering department proposed building an electrical railroad from the university to Palo Alto. Perrine gave the project to students, with the land having been purchased by private owners prior for a railroad that had fallen through. The design proposed no overhead wires, with the plant to be owned by Stanford University, and the engineering and management to be entirely constructed by the different engineering departments at Stanford. A telegraph office was set up in the Electrical Engineering building in 1897 to act as an operator for the Western Union Company.

In 1898, it was reported that Perrine was taking a two-year leave of absence from teaching, but would continue to reside in Palo Alto and would still have charge of the electrical engineering department. With the advancement of electricity, industry and employment opportunities proved plentiful for those with knowledge in the subject. In 1899, Standard Electrical Company completed one of the world's longest transmission lines. Professor FAC Perrine was the engineer, and the following year, he left academia for industry. When Perrine left in 1898, the department was administered instead by civil or mechanical engineering professors instead until 1905. That year, Harris J. Ryan was named both professor and chair of electrical engineering. Under Ryan, the department began teaching high voltage transmission of electric power.

A branch association formed at Stanford University of the American Institute of Electrical Engineers (AIEE) in 1904, with membership limited to upper classmen in the Stanford Electrical Engineering Department. In 1919, Leonard F. Fuller earned a PhD degree at Stanford's electrical engineering department. Primary faculty of the EE department as of 1923 included Ryan as professor, J.C. Clark as associate professor, H.H. Henline as assistant professor, and two instructors. Henline started the communications laboratory in 1924.

In 1925, Stanford established the school of engineering, with all undergraduate degrees in engineering given out by the school instead of the departments with the new change. F.E. Terman joined EE as an instructor, introducing radio courses, and also in 1925, the department opened The Ryan High Voltage Laboratory, financed in large part by Los Angeles and the private power industry.

Leonard Fuller returned to Stanford to serve as an acting professor of electrical engineering from 1946 until he retired in 1954.

==== Government contracts (1940s–1960s) ====
According to historian Piero Scaruffi, in 1946, Frederick E. Terman became dean of Stanford's engineering school, using his connections with the military and the Office of Naval Research to both start and fund the Electronics Research Lab (ERL). The Korean War in 1950 brought in a new infusion of funds from the Office of Naval Research, and Terman used the money to open the Applied Electronics Library, then opening the adjacent Stanford Industrial Park nearby for private business. Terman served as head of the electrical engineering department and dean of the school of engineering until he retired in 1965. Meanwhile, Hugh H. Skilling served as the executive head of the electrical engineering department from 1944 to 1967.

In 1947, E. Ginzton in the EE department helped design and build the first Linear Accelerator. Also that year, a Joint Services Electronics Contract was signed, with the department stating on its website that the contract started "large scale Federal support of Department Research."

The department's Microwave Laboratory in 1949 was moved into a new building with Edward Ginzton as director, and was later turned into the Ginzton Laboratory. The department opened its Electronics Research Library (ERL) in 1951, with HP and Gilfillan "significantly" supporting construction until 1956, according to the department. An IBM 650 computer was maintained in ERL, which was the only air-conditioned room in the building. In 1955, the department held its first courses in digital and analog computing. In 1955, Stanford merged the Electronics Research Laboratory and the Applied Electronics Laboratory into the Systems Engineering Laboratory, to focus on electronic warfare under Terman. According to Stanford, the Applied Electronics Laboratory (AEL) was constructed in 1958 to "support military classified research in electronic countermeasures."

==== Gibbons Plan and AEL occupations (1960s–1970s) ====
John G. Linvill was appointed EE chair in 1964 and subsequently built the semiconductor program at Stanford.

In May 1966, after comments by Stanford administration about contracts, there was picketing by students at Stanford University protesting the Electrical Engineering Department's contract with the Central Intelligence Agency. Heffner kept the nature what he called "purely an engineering research project" secret, stating "we accept grants from donors with whom we do not particularly care to be allied, but we will not refuse a gift if its objectives are worthwhile."

In January 1969, chairman of the Electrical Engineering Department John Linvill stated that the department would allow the enrollment of "minority group" students to study for advanced degrees in electrical engineering. In the Gibbons Plan, the students were only allowed partial credits, with their studies financed by their external employers.

On April 3, 1969, 700 students voted to occupy the AEL. This formed the April Third Movement, a coalition of Stanford campus organizations, occupied the Applied Electronics Laboratory for nine days, in protest for Stanford doing classified work for the government. 1400 Stanford community members signed a statement of participation. At the time, the lab was linked with classified military electronics research and electronic warfare being used against the Vietnamese people. The students of the April Third Movement occupied the hallways of the Applied Electronics Lab building, shutting down research for the occupation. Students slept on the roof of the lab, with large nightly meetings. The group also used the publishing materials in the basement to product documents linking Stanford trustees to defense contractors. The sit-in ultimately led to the school severing ties with the former Stanford Research Institute and moving its military research off campus.

In later 1969, the Applied Electronics Laboratory (AEL), was a part of the Stanford Electronic Laboratory, which was the "research affiliate of the electrical engineering department, especially in doctoral research." That year, AEL director William Rambo admitted after criticism and a sit-in protest that the laboratory was working with the Department of Defense in matters related to the Vietnam War.

In 1969, Stanford EE classes were broadcast to Silicon Valley by the Stanford Instructional Television Network for the first time.

In 1971, the electrical engineering department had the largest graduate enrollment of any department at Stanford University.

=== Chairs and research (1980s–2020s) ===
In 1981, R.L.White was appointed EE chair, with a number of successions over the next two decades.

In 1997, James Plummer became the department chair, as the John M. Fluke Professor of Electrical Engineering. He became dean of the overall engineering department in 1999. Mark Horowitz was appointed chair of EE in 2009.

Jelena Vučković was the "Fortinet Founders" chair of the department as of 2023, leading the department's Nanoscale and Quantum Photonics (NQP) lab. The department is currently based out of the David Packard Building on Jane Stanford Way in Stanford, California. Research is also done out of other locations at Stanford University.

=== Degrees ===
The Stanford University Department of Electrical Engineering offers Bachelor of Science degrees with a major in electrical engineering, full-time Master of Science degrees, and doctoral of philosophy (EE PhD) degrees.

Degree programs offer some flexible options, such as coterminal BS and MS degrees completed in 5 years. The department has two joint degree programs. The joint EE MS/MBA degree is managed in conjunction with the Stanford Graduate School of Business. The JD/EE MS degree is managed in conjunction with the Stanford Law School. The department also offers online graduate certificates, and non-degree options (NDO) with four online certificate programs for graduate-level courses.

=== Research areas ===
Electrical Engineering is a broad subject. Stanford's EE Department presents their research in 3 core areas, and 2 interdisciplinary areas.

- Information Systems & Science
- Hardware/Software Systems
- Physical Technology & Science
- (Interdisciplinary) Energy
- (Interdisciplinary) Biomedical

=== Published work ===
In late 2021 a team in the department was working on ultra-thin solar cell technology, publishing in Nature Communications in December 2021, with co-authors including Nassiri Nazif and Alwin Daus. In December 2022, Yecun Wu of the department was a co-author of Observation of an intermediate state during lithium intercalation of twisted bilayer MoS2 published in Nature.

=== Notable faculty and alumni ===
Name	BS; MS; PhD	Notability
Stephen P. Boyd	professor	IEEE James H. Mulligan Jr. Education Medal, 2017
John Cioffi	professor	Marconi Award, 2006; IEEE Alexander Graham Bell Medal, 2010
Thomas Cover	professor	IEEE Shannon Award, 1990; IEEE Hamming Award, 1997
Abbas El Gamal	professor	IEEE Shannon Award, 2012; IEEE Hamming Award, 2016
James F. Gibbons	professor	IEEE Founders Medal, 2011; IEEE James H. Mulligan Jr. Education Medal, 1985
Andrea Goldsmith	professor	Marconi Award, 2020
Robert M. Gray	professor	IEEE Shannon Award, 2008; IEEE Jack S. Kilby Signal Processing Medal, 2008
Pat Hanrahan	professor	Turing Award, 2019; Academy Award, Scientific and Technical, 2013, 2003, 1992
Martin Hellman	professor	Turing Award, 2015; Marconi Award, 2000; IEEE Hamming Award, 2010; National Inventors Hall of Fame, 2011
John L. Hennessy	professor; president emeritus	Turing Award, 2018; IEEE Medal of Honor, 2012; IEEE John von Neumann Medal, 2000.
Mark Horowitz	professor	ACM - IEEE Eckert–Mauchly Award, 2022; IEEE Donald O. Pederson Award in Solid-State Circuits 2006; founder of Rambus
Thomas H. Lee	professor	The Ho-Am Prize in Engineering, 2011
John Linvill	professor	IEEE James H. Mulligan Jr. Education Medal, 1976;
Teresa Meng	professor	IEEE Alexander Graham Bell Medal, 2019
Arogyaswami Paulraj	professor	MIMO wireless technology; National Inventors Hall of Fame, 2008; Marconi Award, 2014; IEEE Alexander Graham Bell Medal, 2011
Gerald Pearson	professor	National Inventors Hall of Fame, 2008
Jim Plummer	professor	IEEE Founders Medal, 2015
William Shockley	professor	Nobel Prize in Physics, 1956; IEEE Medal of Honor, 1980; National Inventors Hall of Fame, 2016
Frederick E. Terman	professor	IEEE Founders Medal, 1963; IEEE Medal of Honor, 1950; IEEE James H. Mulligan Jr. Education Medal, 1956
David Tse	professor	IEEE Hamming Award, 2019; IEEE Shannon Award, 2017
Jelena Vučković	professor	Humboldt Prize, 2010; IET AF Harvey Prize, 2019
Ellen Ochoa	MS '81; PhD '85	American engineer, former astronaut and former Director of the Johnson Space Center
Acha Leke	MS; PhD	founder African Leadership Academy
Rahul Panicker	MS '04; PhD '08	social enterprise entrepreneur
Marcian Hoff	MS '53; PhD '62	Intel 4004 - invention of microprocessors; National Inventors Hall of Fame, 1996
Stan Honey	MS	Emmys for technical and engineering innovations in sports TV broadcasts. (1) 1998 with ESPN football; (2) 2013 America's Cup LiveLine System won 2 Emmy's (first-down line and hockey puck). (3) Emmy with America's Cup (2013).
Ray Dolby	BS; MS	National Medal of Technology, 1997; Academy Award, Scientific and Technical, 1979, and 1989; National Inventors Hall of Fame, 1984
Kristina M. Johnson	BS; PhD	National Inventors Hall of Fame, 2015
Ralph Merkle	PhD	National Inventors Hall of Fame, 2011
Mark Dean	PhD	National Inventors Hall of Fame, 1997
William R. Hewlett	BS	National Inventors Hall of Fame, 1992
Joseph Jacobson	post-doc researcher	National Inventors Hall of Fame, 2006
Vinton Cerf	BS	National Inventors Hall of Fame, 2004
Bernard M. Oliver	BS	National Inventors Hall of Fame, 2004
Stanley Mazor		National Inventors Hall of Fame, 1996
Stan Honey	MS	National Inventors Hall of Fame, 2018
C. Kumar N. Patel	MS; PhD	National Inventors Hall of Fame, 2012

== Computer science ==
Computer science was established in 1965 in the school of humanities and sciences, but moved to the school of engineering in 1985. The department has been frequently ranked among the top computer science departments globally. The teaching staff have skills and interests encompassing all areas of computing, so there are many multidisciplinary collaborations within the department and outside of it.

In 2017, the Thomas and Stacey Siebel Foundation funded the Thomas M. Siebel Professor in Machine Learning, with the inaugural appointee being Christopher Manning. The position straddles the Departments of Linguistics and Computer Science, and Manning is also director of the Stanford Artificial Intelligence Laboratory and an associate director of the Stanford Institute for Human-Centered Artificial Intelligence.

As of 2026 the Computer Science Department is headed by Mehran Sahami, Tencent Chair of the department as well as James and Ellenor Chesebrough Professor in the School of Engineering. Computer science is "by far, the largest undergraduate major at Stanford".

== See also ==
- List of engineering journals and magazines
