= James Bliss =

James Bliss may refer to:

- James Bliss (politician) (died 1891), Alabama legislator
- James C. Bliss (1933–2012), American electrical engineer

== See also ==
- James Blish (1921–1975), American science fiction and fantasy writer
