= Magnifier =

A magnifier is a device used for magnification.

Magnifier can also refer to:

- Magnifying glass, an optical device for magnification
- Screen magnifier, software that magnifies part of a computer screen
  - Magnifier (Windows), a screen magnifier for Microsoft Windows
  - Magnifier (iOS), a magnifying glass app for iOS
  - Magnifier, a magnifying glass app for Android
- Magnifying transmitter, alternate version of a Tesla Coil
- Sight magnifier, a magnified optic used on firearms

== See also ==
- Video magnifier, an electronic device used for optical magnification
