= Harry Garland =

Computer entrepreneur

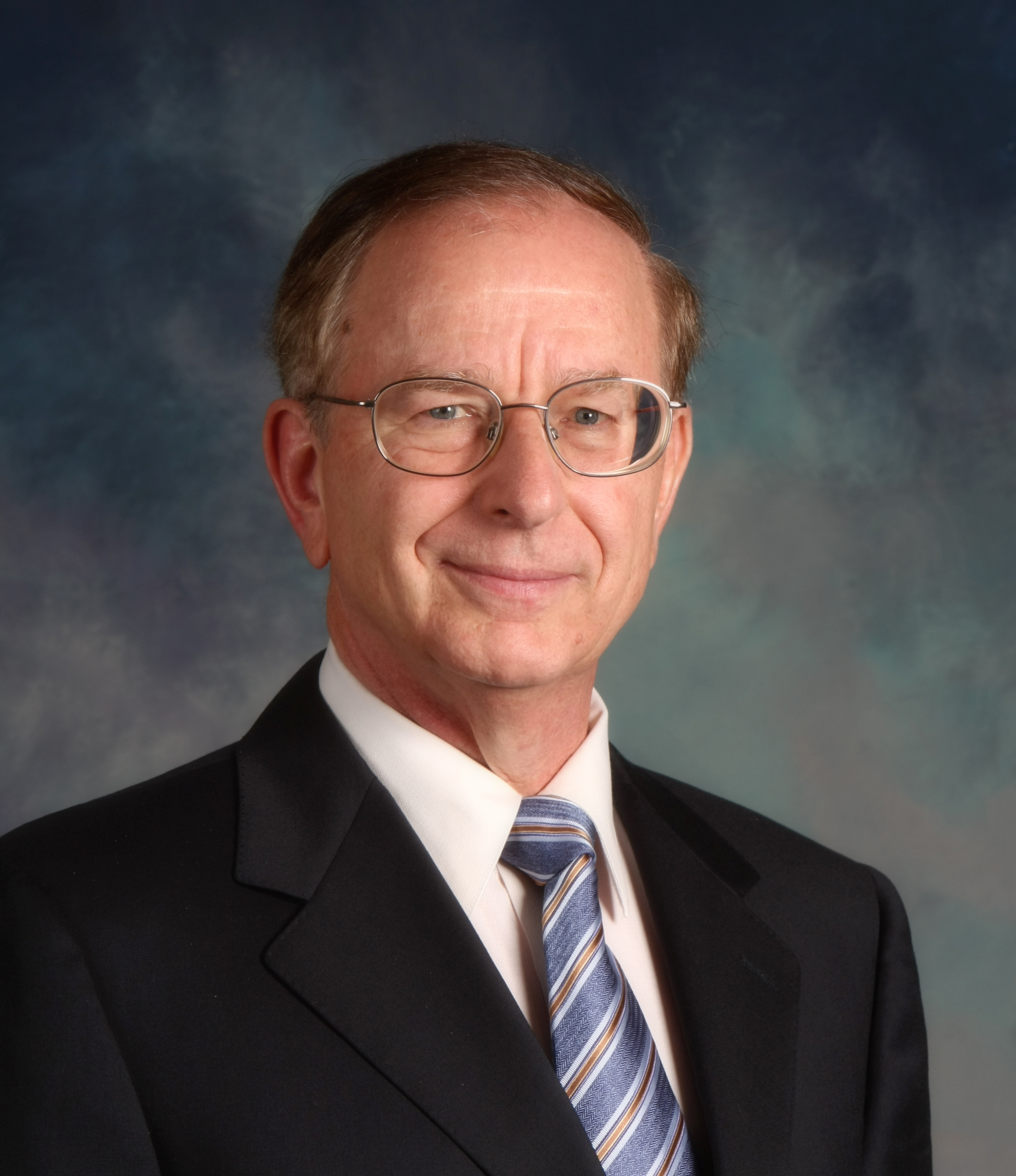
- Harry Thomas Garland
- Born: 1947 (age 78–79); Detroit, Michigan
- Education: B.A. Kalamazoo College; Ph.D. Stanford University
- Occupations: Scientist, Engineer, Author, Entrepreneur
- Known for: Co-founder Cromemco, Inc.
- Call sign: WA8FJW; WA6VYT

Harry T. Garland (born 1947) is a scientist, engineer, author, and entrepreneur who co-founded Cromemco Inc., one of the earliest and most successful microcomputer companies. He received the B.A. degree in mathematics from Kalamazoo College, and the Ph.D. degree in biophysics from Stanford University. Dr. Garland has been recognized as one of the most important innovators in the development of personal computers in Silicon Valley.

== Personal life ==
He is the son of Harry G. Garland, the founder of Garland Manufacturing.

== Stanford University ==
Garland began his graduate work at Stanford University in 1968. Garland's research at Stanford focused on the function of the human brain in controlling voluntary movement. He developed techniques in electromyography for monitoring muscle activity during voluntary movement and worked to delineate the role of the brain and the role of local reflexes in the control of muscles. This led to a deeper understanding of brain function during voluntary movement, and insight into the mode of action of L-DOPA in the treatment of Parkinson's disease.

Garland received the doctoral degree from Stanford in 1972. He was invited by John G. Linvill to join the research staff of the Stanford Electronics Laboratories where he worked on the Optacon project and developed the concept for the next generation Optacon reading aid for the blind. In 1974, he was appointed Assistant Chairman of the Department of Electrical Engineering at Stanford University; he taught graduate courses in electrical engineering and published a textbook in the new field of microprocessor system design.

== Popular Electronics ==
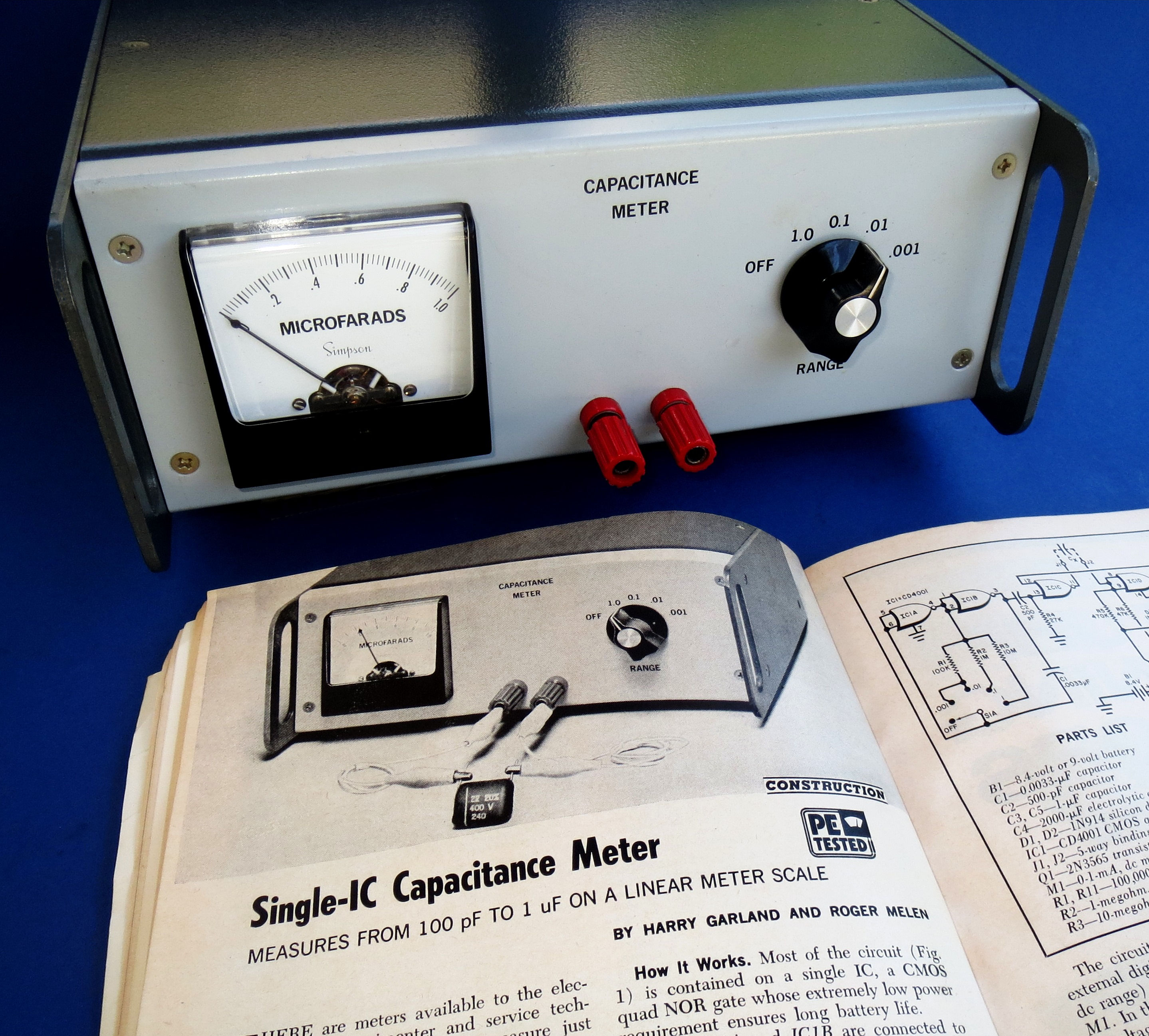
Capacitance meter designed by Harry Garland and Roger Melen introduced in Popular Electronics magazine in 1974

While at Stanford University, Dr. Garland also worked to bring electronics technology to a wider audience. Over a period of six years, in collaboration with Stanford colleague Roger Melen, he wrote a series of articles for Popular Electronics magazine describing original designs that could be built by the electronic hobbyist. During this period, Garland and Melen also published two books: Understanding IC Operational Amplifiers and Understanding CMOS Integrated Circuits.

The MITS Altair computer, which launched the microcomputer industry, was introduced in January 1975 issue of Popular Electronics magazine. That same issue carried an article by Garland and Melen on solid-state image sensors. The following month they, together with their Stanford colleague Terry Walker, published the design of the world's first completely digital solid-state camera in Popular Electronics, and began work on developing an interface to connect the camera (which they called the “Cyclops”), to the MITS Altair computer. MITS introduced the Cyclops Camera as a peripheral for the Altair Computer in January 1976.

Their next project for Popular Electronics was to develop an interface between the Altair computer and a color television set. They called it the “Dazzler”. Garland and Melen again collaborated with Terry Walker on the hardware design and with Ed Hall, a fellow member of the Homebrew Computer Club, on the software design. The Dazzler appeared on the front cover of the February 1976 issue of Popular Electronics, and Garland and Melen offered a kit of parts for sale.

To support their sales of the Cyclops and the Dazzler, Garland and Melen rented a 200 sq. ft. office in Los Altos, California and formed Cromemco, a company named after the Stanford dormitory where they had both lived as graduate students.

== Cromemco ==
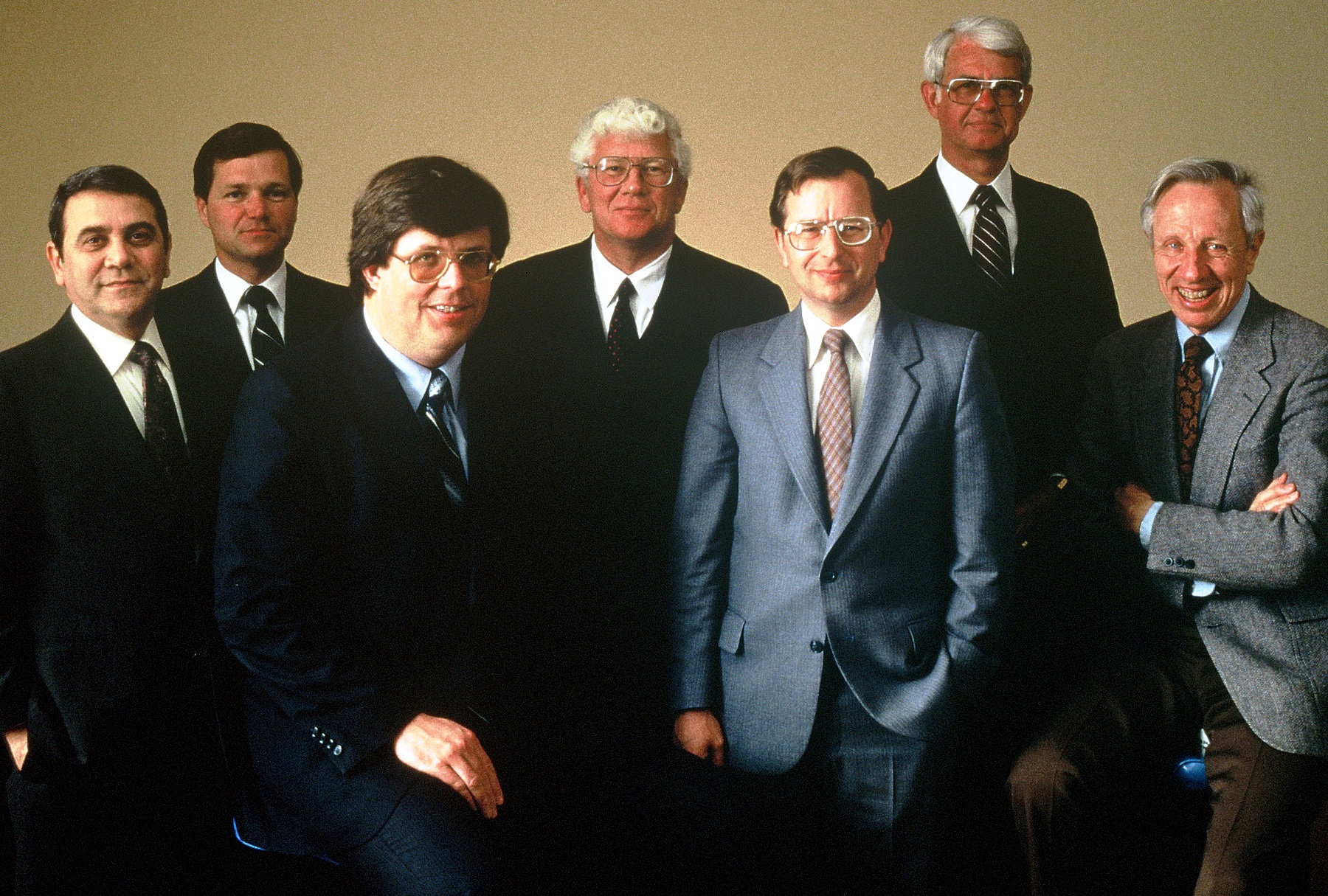
Harry Garland with the officers and directors of Cromemco in 1984. From left to right: Andy Procassini, Mike Ramelot, Roger Melen, Chuck Bush, Harry Garland, Glenn Penisten, John G. Linvill.

Dr. Garland was president of Cromemco from its incorporation in 1976 until its sale in 1987. From the original Cyclops and Dazzler products the company developed a full line of microcomputer systems that were rated as the most reliable in the industry. Cromemco systems became the systems of choice for broadcast television graphics, were widely deployed as Mission Planning Systems by the United States Air Force, and were the first microcomputer systems widely distributed in China.

By 1980 Cromemco occupied 200,000 sq. ft. of manufacturing and office space in Mountain View, California, and In 1981 Inc. Magazine ranked Cromemco in the top 10 fastest growing privately held companies in the U.S. Garland achieved this growth without accepting any external equity financing.

The success of Cromemco products in television broadcast applications was based on a successor product to the original Dazzler, called the "Super Dazzler" interface (SDI). ColorGraphics Weather Systems, a customer of Cromemco, developed software for the SDI specifically for television weather graphics and digital art creation. Dynatech Corporation, the parent company of ColorGraphics Weather Systems, sought to acquire Cromemco to provide the computer and graphics systems for their broadcast division, and purchased Cromemco in 1987.

== Further activity ==
In 1990 Dr. Garland was invited by Dr. Hajime Mitarai, president of Canon Inc., to help establish a new R&D center for Canon in Silicon Valley. Dr. Garland served as Vice President of this new center, Canon Research Center America, from 1990 to 2001. At Canon he developed technology for medical digital radiography equipment, and worked on standards to integrate this equipment with hospital and radiology information systems. He served on the Kalamazoo College Board of Trustees from 1987 to 2005, and on the board of Industry Initiatives for Science and Math Education (IISME) from 1996 to 2010 including a term as president of that board. In 2002 Dr. Garland co-founded Garland Actuarial LLC with his wife, Roberta J. Garland, and serves as chairman of the firm.

== Recognition ==
Dr. Garland's contributions to the computer industry have been recognized in numerous books and on television, including appearances on the Financial News Network, The Personal Computer Show, The Screen Savers, and in the PBS documentary Triumph of the Nerds. He has received the Sesquicentennial Award from Kalamazoo College and the Distinguished Alumni Award. He is the author of three books: Understanding IC Operational Amplifiers, Understanding CMOS Integrated Circuits, and Introduction to Microprocessor System Design. He has been awarded 20 U.S. Patents.
