= Margaret Kahn =

American writer and linguist

- Born: New York City, U.S.
- Education: Barnard College; University of Michigan (PhD)
- Occupations: Writer; linguist
- Writing career
- Pen name: Margy Kahn
- Website: pearlnotepress.com

Margaret Kahn (pen name, Margy Kahn) is an internationally known American writer and linguist. She is the author of Children of the Jinn: In Search of the Kurds and Their Country, first published by Seaview Books in 1980 with a second updated edition issued in 2020. She is also the author of Borrowing and Variation in a Phonological Description of Kurdish. She wrote the entry on Kurds in The Harvard Encyclopedia of American Ethnic Groups. Her articles on phonetics and phonology have appeared in a number of academic journals, and her short stories have been published both in literary journals and popular magazines. Her plays have been produced at theaters in California and Maryland.

== Education and academic work ==
Born in New York City, Kahn went to Barnard College where she graduated cum laude with a major in linguistics and a minor in writing. Upon graduation she was offered an NDEA fellowship to the linguistics department at the University of Michigan where she took courses in Arabic as well as theoretical linguistics. She was among the first scholars to study gender differences in language.

In graduate school in Ann Arbor, she studied articulatory phonetics with J.C. Catford. She also worked at one of the first women's crisis centers in the country. After receiving a master's degree in linguistics, she went to Iran where she taught English as a second language at Rezaiyeh Agricultural College in the city now known as Urmia, and pursued field research on Kurdish. After receiving her Ph.D. in theoretical linguistics from the University of Michigan, she became a Research Affiliate in the speech communication group of the Research Lab of Electronics at MIT where she helped author several papers on the phonetics of Persian and taught briefly at Boston and Tufts Universities. In 1978, she took a position as a lecturer in the Department of Acoustics at Alexandria University in Egypt where she taught Arabic phonetics.

== Speech engineering ==
In 1980, Kahn began working at Telesensory Systems in Palo Alto where she applied linguistic knowledge to improve the quality of text-to-speech for a product commissioned by the Canon Corporation. In 1981, she became a Member of Technical Staff at Hewlett Packard Labs. At HP, she continued to work on the quality of compressed speech as well as testing for speech recognition systems. She also consulted for Apple Computer on improving the quality of their text-to-speech. Later, she worked for Sensory Access Foundation in Palo Alto. Her paper on a side-by-side comparison of reading machines was presented at the 1994 Closing the Gap Conference in Minneapolis. In addition she consulted at Stanford's Center for the Study of Language and Information where she helped organize the disability portion of the Sixth International World Wide Web Conference in 1997, focusing on access to the graphical user interface for blind and low vision users.

== Fiction and drama ==
Kahn's short stories about interactions between Americans and people from the Middle East have appeared in a variety of magazines. Under the name “Margy Kahn” she has written a number of short plays and two longer plays which have had staged readings and full productions in California and in Maryland.

== Publications ==
=== Selected academic ===
- “Non-Physiological Variation in the Pronunciation of Arabic by Men and Women, The Journal of the Acoustical Society of America, 1974
- “Arabic Emphatics: the evidence for cultural determinants of phonetic sex-typing,” Phonetica 1975
- Borrowing and Variation in a Phonological Description of Kurdish, Natural Language Studies No. 22, The University of Michigan Phonetics Laboratory, Ann Arbor 1976

=== Selected non-fiction ===
- How to Organize a Women's Crisis-Service Center, Catherine McClary; Leslie Horst; Margaret Kahn; Deborah Sedore; Jan BenDor; Sue Keener; Mimi Brown; Carolee Colter; Susan Smith; Lisa Gayle; Carole Bell; Donna Waldman; Carol Newberry; Lynn Zimmerman; Sandra Baseman; Ann Arbor 1974
- "The Enforcement of Title IX," The Women's Yellow Pages, Boston 1978
- Children of the Jinn: In Search of the Kurds and Their Country, Seaview Books, New York 1980
- "Kurds," Harvard Encyclopedia of American Ethnic Groups, Harvard University Press, 1980
- "Behind the Invisible Veil," Connexions, Fall 1981
- "The Forty Steps," Connexions, Spring 1982
- "The Language 'Nobody' Speaks," Azadi Kurdistan, May 1984
- "Institut Kurde de Paris," Azadi Kurdistan, July 1985
- "Can Evil Be Followed by Good?" Azadi Kurdistan, March 1986
- Children of the Jinn, 2nd edition, Pearlnote Press, Pacific Grove 2020

=== Fiction ===
- "In the Field," Kalliope, Fall/Winter 1986
- "Crossing the Border," Ararat, Summer 1987
- "Feast of Sacrifice," West, The Sunday magazine of the San Jose Mercury News, July 19, 1987
- "The Idle Mill," Ararat, Spring 1991
- "Understanding the Enemy," Iowa Woman, Spring 1992; reprinted in Ararat, Autumn 1992; reprinted in Iowa Woman: In Celebration of Our First 15 Years, Fall 1995
- “Black Seeds,” Ararat Summer 1995
- “Taqseem,” Crab Orchard Review, 2000
- “Talking Moharrém Blues,” Pangyrus Four, 2018

=== Plays ===
- Familiar Strangers, (full-length) Pear Avenue Theatre, Mountain View, March 2012
- The Packrat Gene, (full-length) Ross Valley Players, Ross, CA –originally scheduled for March 2020, rescheduled for March 2022
