= James F. Gibbons =

American electrical engineer and academic administrator (born 1931)

- Born: September 19, 1931 (age 95); Leavenworth, Kansas, U.S.
- Education: Stanford University; Northwestern University
- Awards: IEEE Jack A. Morton Award (1980); IEEE James H. Mulligan, Jr. Education Medal (1985); IEEE Paul Rappaport Award (1989); IEEE Founders Medal (2011)
- Scientific career
- Fields: Electrical engineering
- Workplaces: Stanford University

James Franklin Gibbons (born September 19, 1931) is an American electrical engineer and academic administrator. He is credited (together with William Shockley) with starting the semiconductor device fabrication laboratory at Stanford University that enabled the semiconductor industry and created Silicon Valley.

Gibbons is also credited for inventing Tutored Video Instruction, which is widely used at Stanford University and its Stanford Instructional Television Network. The Tutored Video Instruction is used to educate engineers and non students who are in need via SERA Learning Technologies (which Gibbons founded).

Gibbons was elected a member of the National Academy of Engineering in 1974 for leadership as a teacher, author, and researcher in semiconductor electronics.

== Early life ==
James F. Gibbons was born in Leavenworth, Kansas on September 19, 1931, to Clifford and Mary Gibbons. His father was a guard at United States Penitentiary, Leavenworth, until Gibbons was about eight years old. At that time, his father was transferred to a minimum security prison in Texarkana, Texas. Gibbons spent his middle and high school years there, until he went off to college.

== Higher education ==
Gibbons left Texas to pursue his undergraduate degree in electrical engineering at Northwestern University chosen due to receiving a partial scholarship from Northwestern, Northwestern's proximity to Chicago and the jazz music scene there (Gibbons played trombone and was also pondering a possible musical career), and also due to Northwestern's co-op requirement. Gibbons co-oped at Tungstal, where he worked on vacuum tubes being used in televisions. In 1953, after five years (due to the mandatory co-op), Gibbons finished his B.S. degree in electrical engineering at Northwestern University in 1953. He also earned a National Science Foundation fellowship from his efforts at Northwestern, which was able to be used at any school across the United States.

After discussions with his Northwestern advisor (who was the chairman of Electrical Engineering Department), Gibbons chose to accept admission to Stanford University for his advanced degree work. At Stanford, Gibbons took a course titled "Transistors and Active Circuit Design.”, which was being taught by John Linvill, formerly of Bell Labs. This course captivated Gibbons and he spent extra time with Linvill, leading Linvill to convince Gibbons that he should stay at Stanford and earn a Ph.D. Gibbons did just that (graduating with a Ph.D. from Stanford in 1956) and his Ph.D. thesis was on a methodology for transistor circuit design that would utilize feedback to mitigate the variations between transistors of that time. Based on his efforts at Stanford, Gibbons was awarded a Fulbright scholarship, which he utilized at Cambridge University to work on grain boundaries in magnetic materials.

== Academic career ==
After completing his work at Cambridge, Gibbons was considering several job opportunities when John Linvill again interceded. Linvill convinced Gibbons to consider a hybrid position where he would work 50% at Shockley Semiconductor to learn semiconductor fabrication techniques from William Shockley and the other 50% as an assistant professor at Stanford, setting up a laboratory to fabricate semiconductors and teaching the techniques to Stanford Ph.D. students.

On August 1, 1957, Gibbons joined the Stanford faculty and began his work with Shockley. Six months later, Gibbons' lab at Stanford produced its first silicon device. After presenting a conference paper on their results, the Stanford semiconductor fabrication lab became the cornerstone upon which John Linvill and Stanford built a solid-state electronics laboratory and attracted to Stanford some of the leading people in the burgeoning field of semiconductors, including persons such as Gerald Pearson and John Moll.

Stanford named Gibbons as a professor of Electrical Engineering in 1964 and dean of the School of Engineering in 1984, a position he held until June 1996. In 1995, Gibbons was appointed as special counsel to the Stanford University President and Provost for Industry Relations at Stanford University.

Gibbons also contributed to the Stanford Instructional Television Network; he invented a widely used Tutored Video Instruction that is used at Stanford University and in other places. This video network is to extend the education of engineers. Gibbon's Tutored video instruction has been used to educate the children of migrant farm workers and to help at-risk teens with their anger problems. He founded SERA Learning Technologies which utilizes this technology for that aim.

== Industry leadership ==
He served on the Board of Directors of:

- SRI International
- Raychem
- Cisco Systems
- Lockheed-Martin

He also served on committees advising the Presidential Science Advisor in the Nixon, Reagan, Bush and Clinton administrations.

== Awards and honors ==
Gibbons has received many awards and was elected a member of the American Academy or Arts and Sciences, the National Academy of Sciences, the National Academy of Engineering, and as a Fellow of the IEEE.

- He was awarded the IEEE Jack A. Morton Award in 1980 for his outstanding contributions in the field of solid-state devices.
- He was awarded the IEEE James H. Mulligan, Jr. Education Medal (formerly the IEEE Education Medal) in 1985 for his contributions to the vitality, imagination, and leadership of the members of the engineering profession.
- He was awarded the IEEE Founders Medal in 2011 for his outstanding contributions to the leadership, planning, and administration of affairs of great value to the electrical and electronics engineering profession.
- He was awarded the Millennium Medal by the IEEE Electron Devices Society for his outstanding contributions.
- He was awarded the Paul Rappaport Award by the IEEE Electron Devices Society in 1989 for co-authoring "Bandgap and Transport Properties of Si1-xGex by Analysis of Nearly Ideal Si/Si1-xGex/Si Heterojunction Bipolar Transistors T-ED/ED-36/10".
