= Jim Plummer =

Canadian-born electrical engineer

- Born: James D. Plummmer; Toronto, Ontario, Canada
- Education: University of California, Los Angeles Stanford University
- Known for: silicon process modeling (SUPREM), silicon device structures, insulated gate bipolar transistor; teaching
- Awards: IEEE Founders Medal; IEEE Andrew S. Grove Award; IEEE J. J. Ebers Award
- Scientific career
- Workplaces: Stanford University
- Doctoral advisor: James D. Meindl
- Website: https://profiles.stanford.edu/jim-plummer

James D. Plummer is a Canadian-born electrical engineer. He is the John M. Fluke Professor of Electrical Engineering at Stanford University, and from 1999 to 2014 served as Frederick Emmons Terman Dean of the School of Engineering.

== Education and academic career ==
Jim Plummer was born in Toronto, Canada, and educated in the United States. Plummer completed his BS in electrical engineering at the University of California, Los Angeles in 1966. He received his MS in 1967 and PhD in 1971, both in electrical engineering from Stanford University.

Prior to joining the faculty of the Stanford Department of Electrical Engineering in 1978, Plummer was a research associate and associate director of the Integrated Circuits Laboratory (ICL). Stanford's Integrated Circuits Lab (ICL) was revamped to accommodate microchip fabrication and research, opening a new facility in 1984 under the directorship of James D. Meindl. The lab's cleanroom and vibration-free construction was state-of-the-art. Jim Plummer was director of the ICL until 1993.

From 1993 to 1996, Plummer was senior associate dean of Stanford University School of Engineering. He was director of the Stanford Nanofabrication Facility (SNF) from 1994 to 2000. From 1997 to 1999, he was chair of the Stanford Department of Electrical Engineering.

Plummer was selected as dean of Stanford University School of Engineering from 1999 through 2014. He is the longest-serving dean of the school to date.

During his tenure as Frederick Emmons Terman Dean of the School of Engineering, he is credited with changing Stanford's character of graduate and undergraduate engineering curriculum toward being hands-on, interdisciplinary and creative. During his time as dean, the percentage of engineering undergraduates increased from 20% to 35% of the student body.

Stanford University's Science and Engineering Quad was also completed in 2014, completing a 25-year effort to house all nine engineering departments in 21st century facilities. Plummer strongly supported and led the School of Engineering toward bioengineering. He helped establish the Department of Bioengineering, which started in 2002. Bioengineering is the only joint department at Stanford, run by the School of Engineering and the School of Medicine.

== Research ==
Plummer's research lies in semiconductor devices and technology, primarily silicon based devices but recently also in wide bandgap materials for power applications. As of 2019 Plummer holds approximately 20 patents.

== Awards and honors ==
- 2015 – IEEE Founders Medal
- 2008 – Elected as Fellow, American Academy of Arts and Sciences (AAAS)
- 2007 – IEEE Andrew S. Grove Award
- 2004 – McGraw-Hill/Jacob Millman Award, for outstanding contributions to EE education
- 2003 – J. J. Ebers Award, IEEE
- 1996 – Member of the United States National Academy of Engineering
- 1995 – Society of Women Engineers, Best Teacher Award
- Fellow of the IEEE
