= Leonard F. Fuller =

American radio pioneer

Dr. Leonard F. Fuller (August 21, 1890 – April 23, 1987) was a noted American radio pioneer. In 1919, Fuller earned a PhD degree at the Stanford Department of Electrical Engineering. In World War I, he was part of the antisubmarine group of the National Research Council, and charged with the design and installation of the "high-power transoceanic radio telegraph stations" built by the United States Army and Navy. He held 24 patients for inventions before his death. He spent time as chair of the electrical engineering department at University of California, Berkeley, and then was acting professor of electrical engineering at Stanford University from 1946 until he retired in 1954.

== Biography ==
Fuller was born in Portland, Oregon on 21 August 1890. As a boy he described always being interested in mechanical and electrical affairs, becoming interested in telegraphy and wireless. Around 1902, he first heard of Guglielmo Marconi's early work with wireless radio, developing an interest. In 1905, he began to listen in on communications by building his own electrolytic detector out of a lamp. In 1906, he obtained a loan from a local power company to secure a transformer for a spark transmitter he made near his house.

He graduated from Portland Academy in 1908. In 1912 he graduated from Cornell University with an M.E. degree. He then promptly joined the National Electric Signaling Company, Brooklyn, New York, switching after a few months to the Federal Telegraph Company at San Francisco, becoming its chief engineer in 1913. He initially worked under Cyril Frank Elwell, who left in 1913, with Fuller then later becoming Chief Electrical Engineer of the company.

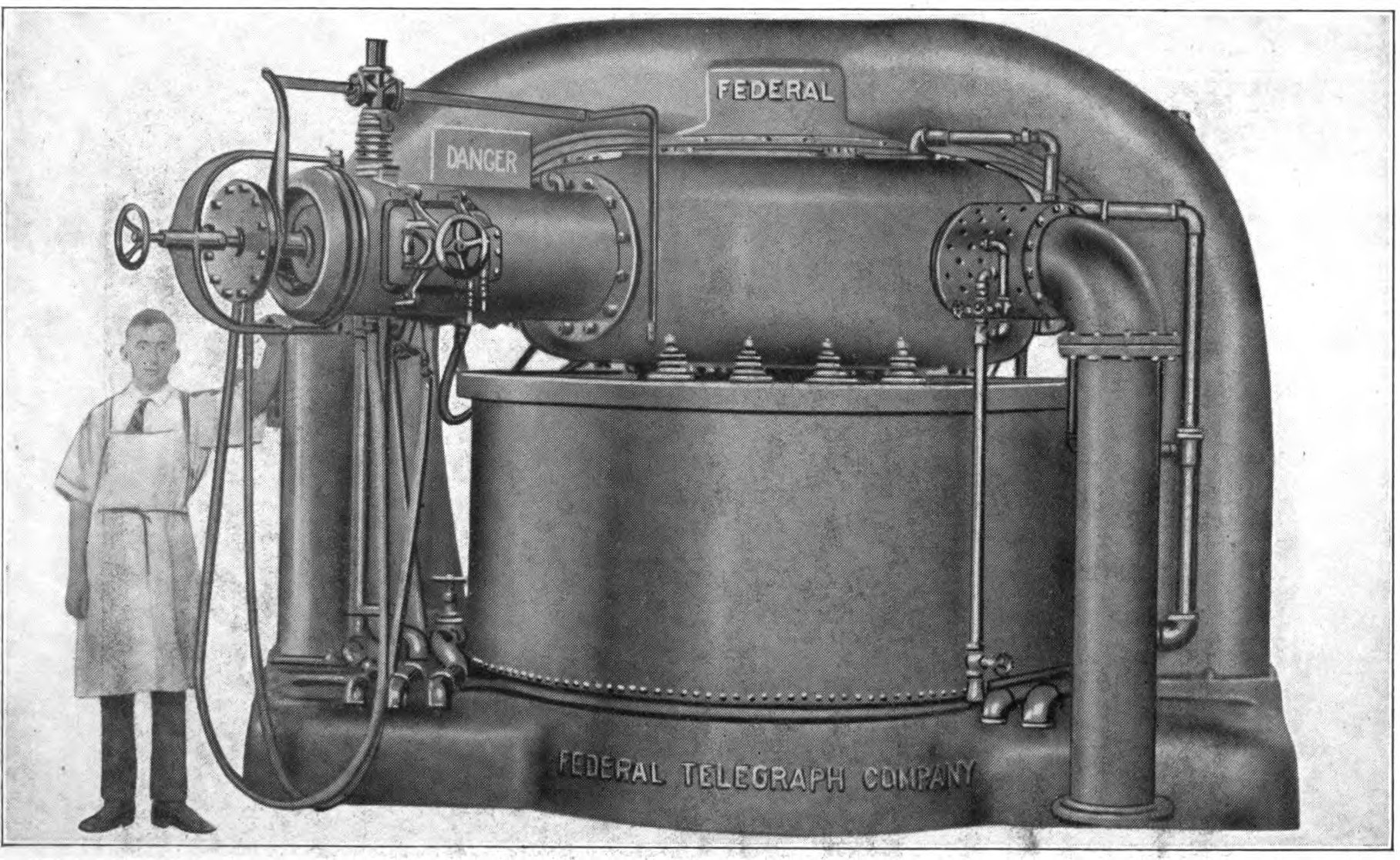
One megawatt Poulsen arc radio transmitter built by Federal in 1919 for the US Navy, whose development was headed by Fuller (Fuller not pictured).

In World War I, he was part of the antisubmarine group of the National Research Council, and charged with the design and installation of the "high-power transoceanic radio telegraph stations" built by the United States Army and Navy. From 1913 to 1919 he led development and manufacture of Poulsen arc transmitters (ranging in sizes from 200, 350, 500 and up to 1,000 kilowatts) for the Army and Navy, which were then installed in stations for trans-oceanic communications in the United States, France, Panama, Hawaii, and across the Pacific to the Philippines.

He also continued his studies at Stanford University, receiving Stanford's first Ph.D. granted in electrical engineering in 1919.

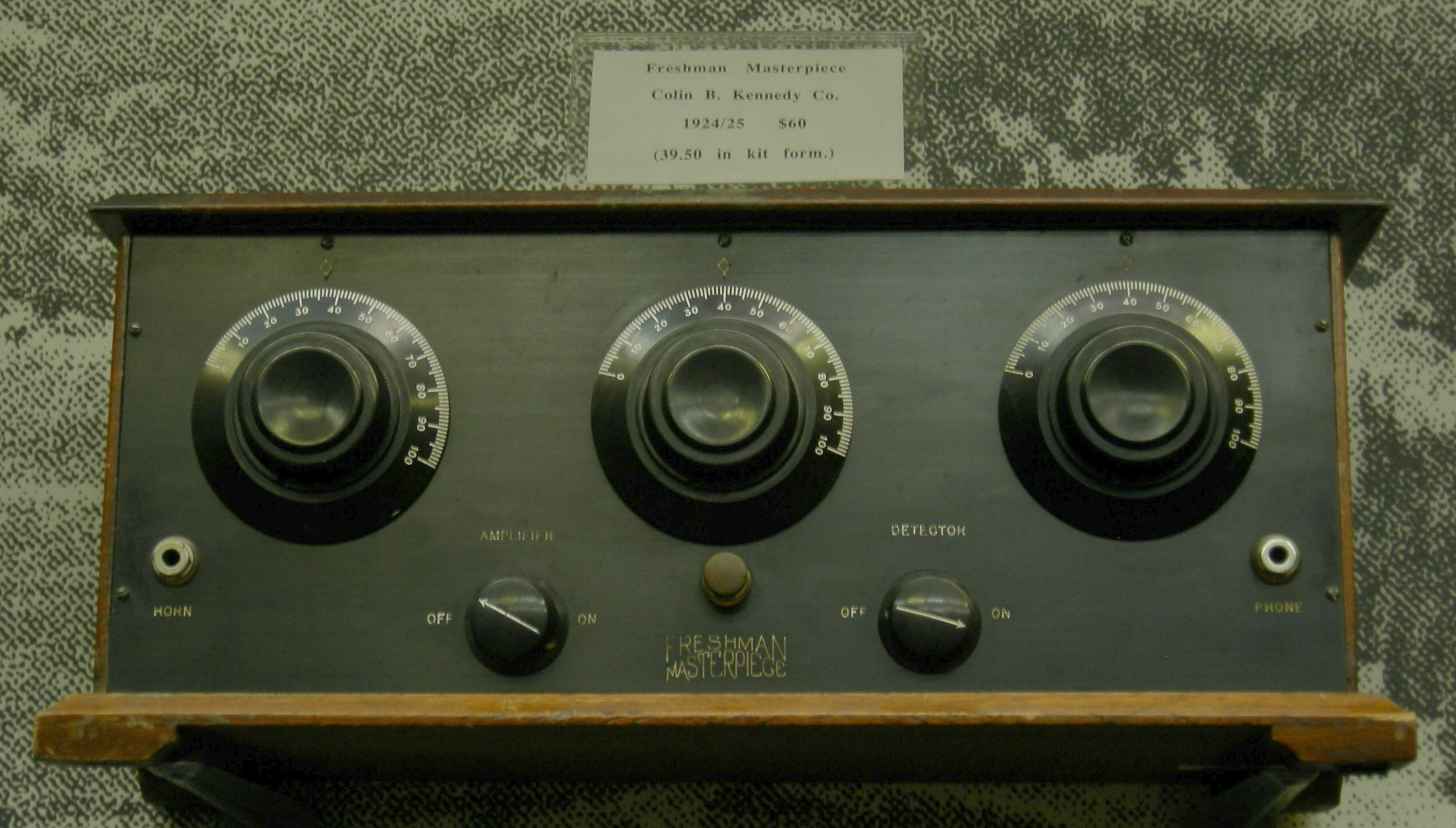
1925 Freshman Masterpiece radio, Colin B. Kennedy Co.

From 1919 to 1923 Fuller manufactured radio receivers at the Colin B. Kennedy Company, San Francisco, which he founded, and performed private consulting in communications for electrical power companies.

In 1921 and 1922, he designed and installed the world's first carrier current telephone system on power lines above 50,000 volts.

From 1923-1926 he worked for General Electric in Schenectady and New York City.

In 1926 he returned to San Francisco for GE. There he led new high voltage developments and the application of vacuum tubes for the west coast's electric power industry, including power-line communications between Hoover Dam and Los Angeles. He then returned to Federal Telegraph Company as its executive vice president and chief engineer, managing its plant at Palo Alto.

In January 1928, he was named to the board of the IEEE Institute, becoming chairman of the San Francisco section of the institute.

From 1930 to 1943 Fuller was professor of electrical engineering at the University of California, Berkeley, also serving as department chair. In this role he became friends with Ernest Lawrence, and constructed as a gift the Berkeley radiation laboratory's first large cyclotron. From 1946-1954, he was coordinator of contract research and acting professor of electrical engineering at Stanford.

He was a Fellow of the Institute of Radio Engineers as of 1928, and the American Institute of Electrical Engineers, and a member of the American Physical Society.

Fuller held 24 patents for inventions.

== Awards ==
In 1919, he received the IEEE Morris N. Liebmann Memorial Award by the IEEE institute for contributions to long-distance radio communication. 1919 was the first year it was awarded.
