= Lester Hogan =

American physicist

C. Lester Hogan

Clarence Lester Hogan (February 8, 1920 – August 12, 2008) was an American physicist and a pioneer in microwave and semiconductor technology.

He grew up as a brother to three sisters in Great Falls, Montana, where his father worked for the Great Northern Railway. After graduating from Montana State University with a degree in chemical engineering he joined the United States Navy in 1942. He did some work on acoustic torpedoes in Chesapeake Bay, and when being approached by Bell Laboratories, subsequently went to the Pacific theatre to train submarine crews in the use of that technology.

After the war he did post-graduate studies at Lehigh University and obtained a Ph.D. in physics. He then joined Bell Labs in 1950. A couple of months later he invented the Microwave Gyrator (a device which can simulate inductance by substituting an RC circuit, thus getting rid of awkward coil assemblies). He worked under Bill Shockley, inventor of the transistor and Nobel Prize laureate. From 1953 through 1958 he was a professor at Harvard University, when he was asked by Dan Noble to join Motorola Semiconductor in Phoenix, Arizona, as vice president and general manager of the semiconductor operation.

In 1968 he moved to Fairchild Camera & Instrument as chairman and CEO, taking eight senior executives (nicknamed Hogan's Heroes) with him. This move caused Motorola to sue Fairchild (unsuccessfully) for theft of trade secrets.

In 1975 he received IEEE's "Frederik Philips Award". In 1978 he was honoured with the "AeA Medal of Achievement". In 1993 he received the "MTT-S (Microwave Theory and Technology Society) Microwave Pioneer Award". In 1996, a chair at the department of Electrical Engineering and Computer Science at the University of California, Berkeley was named in his honor, currently held by Shafi Goldwasser. On October 20, 1999, he was inducted as "Eminent Member" of Eta Kappa Nu, "the society’s highest membership classification, to be conferred upon those select few whose technical attainments and contributions to society through leadership in the field of electrical and computer engineering have resulted in significant benefits to humankind".

C. Lester Hogan died at the age of 88 due to complications of Alzheimer's disease at his home in Atherton, California.
