= Telesensory Systems =

Company in Bakersfield, United States

Telesensory Systems, Inc.
- Formerly: TeleSensory Corporation
- Type: Corporation
- Industry: Assistive technology
- Founded: 1970; 56 years ago
- Defunct: March 2005
- Fate: Chapter 7 bankruptcy
- Headquarters: Bakersfield, United States
- Products: Optacon; Speech+ Calculator; VERT; VersaBraille; OsCar; Vista; Vantage; Aladdin; PICO

Telesensory Systems, Inc. (TSI) (later TeleSensory Corporation) was an American corporation that invented, designed, manufactured, and distributed technological aids for blind and low vision persons. TSI's products helped visually impaired people work independently with computers and with ordinary printed materials.

== History ==
The Optacon, TSI's first product, was conceived by Electrical Engineering Professor John G. Linvill as a means for his blind daughter, Candy, to read ordinary print. The Optacon development, led by James C. Bliss, involved dozens of engineers and scientists at Stanford University and at Stanford Research Institute (now SRI International) starting in 1962. Following the successful demonstration of a functional prototype in 1969, TSI was founded in 1970 in Palo Alto, California, USA. TSI developed a line of products for blind people during the 1970s, and expanded into the low vision field in 1984.

TSI's products for blind people employed either tactile or auditory means of conveying information; its low vision products increased the size and contrast of printed material or computer screen images. Some TSI products consisted of software only, but most also needed custom electronics hardware.

For thirty-five years TSI provided electronic assistive devices to visually impaired persons worldwide. Concurrently computer technology improved and computer operating systems began to incorporate accessibility options such as speech screen readers or magnification for no cost. Having changed its name to "TeleSensory", the company shifted its focus to low visions products and stopped manufacturing blindness products in the early 1990s.

In March, 2005, TeleSensory, the former TSI, abruptly declared Chapter 7 bankruptcy and all its employees were escorted from the building.

In August, 2005, InSiPhil (S) Pte Ltd. of Singapore purchased TeleSensory's intellectual property and remaining assets and resumed production of some of the low vision products under the name and logo of TeleSensory. As of early 2010, these products are available in 50 countries.

== Selected products for blind people ==
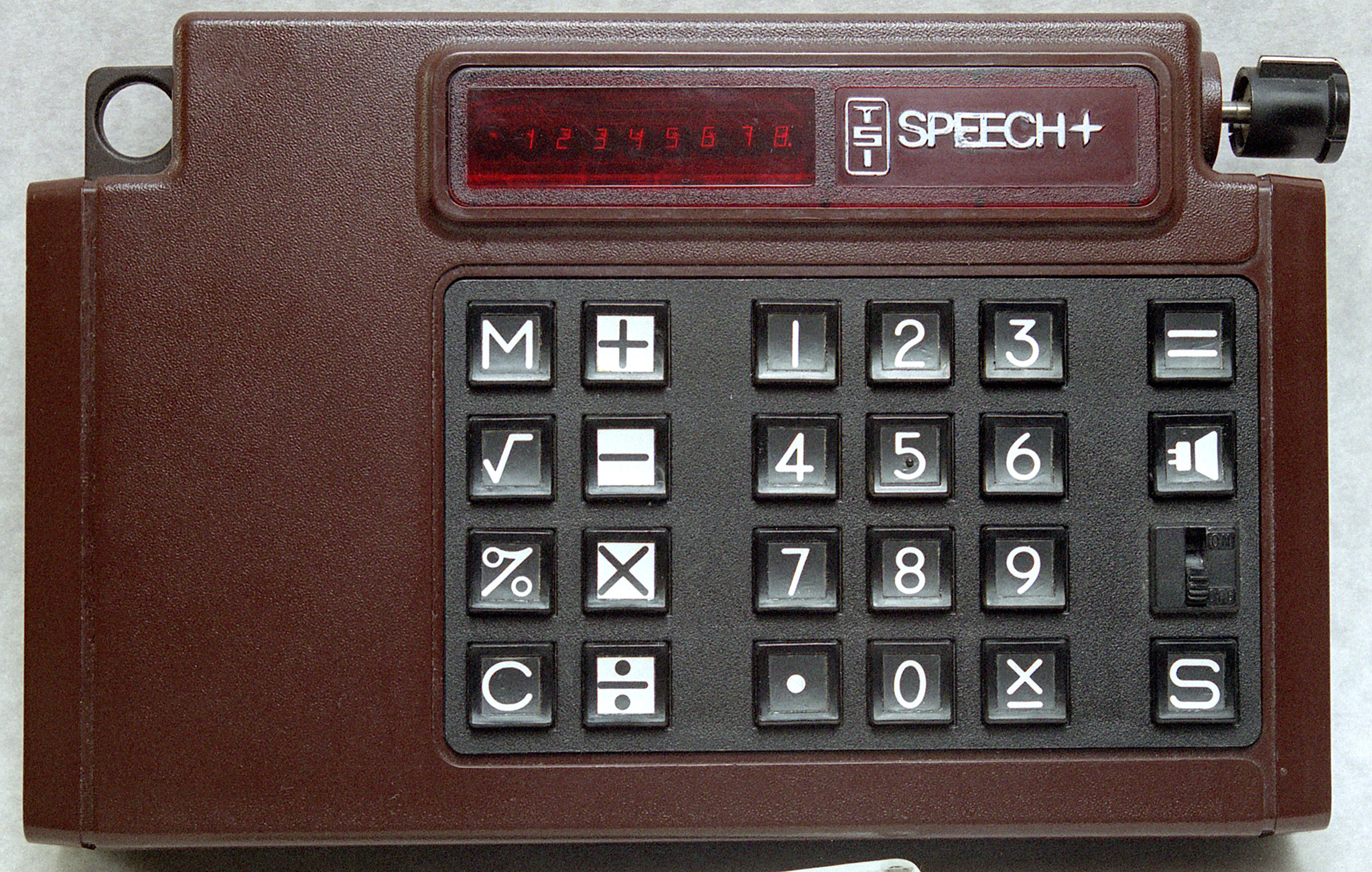
The Speech+ talking calculator

- Optacon, 1970 (tactile facsimile machine for reading ordinary print)
- Speech+ Calculator, 1975 (calculator with synthesized speech output)
- VERT, 1979 (speech output screen reader for computer access)
- VersaBraille, 1979 (personal computer with refreshable braille display)
- OsCar, an optical character recognition speech output reading machine

== Selected products for visually impaired people ==
- Vista (screen enlarger for computer access)
- Vantage (closed-circuit TV magnifier for print or images)
- Aladdin (video magnifier)
- PICO (handheld video magnifier)
