= Information Technology Association of America =

- Trade name: ITIA (1960-present)
- Type: Industry trade group
- Founded: 1960
- Defunct: 2009
- Successor: TechAmerica
- Headquarters: USA
- Website: www.comptia.org/advocacy

The Information Technology Association of America (ITAA), formerly the Association of Data Processing Service Organizations (ADAPSO), was a leading industry trade group for information technology companies. The association's membership contained most of the world's major Information and communications technology (ICT) firms, accounting for over 90% of ICT goods and services sold in North America. By 2009, the organization had merged with others to form TechAmerica

== History ==
Organizational meetings of what was initially called the Data Actuating Technical Association (DATA) began in 1960. In 1961, the Association of Data Processing Service Organizations (ADAPSO) was founded as a "service bureau" trade association, and formally incorporated in 1962. Initially headquartered in Abington, Pennsylvania, then relocating to downtown New York city, ADAPSO published directories of the nascent industry, commissioned well-regarded surveys of the computer industry, and organized user-centered "Management Symposiums" that discussed the industry, pricing, and ethics. ADAPSO's industry surveys were taken up by Peter Cunningham's INPUT. ADAPSO moved to the Washington, D.C., area in 1978 to be closer to government policymakers and advocates. ADAPSO was renamed ITAA in 1991.

In March 2007 ITAA President Phil Bond expressed his desire in merging ITAA with another high tech trade association. On January 17, 2008, ITAA announced that it had agreed to so-called "merger of equals" with the Government Electronics and Information Technology Association (GEIA), and that the combined association would retain the ITAA name. Until earlier in the year GEIA had been an affiliate of EIA (a trade association formerly known as the Electronic Industries Alliance) EIA has been very financially successful, unlike ITAA. GEIA is slated to share in the distribution over $50 million in assets resulting in the breakup of EIA. [The fall of EIA: What happened?

In 2008 the ITAA merged with the CyberSecurity Industry Alliance and the Government Electronics Industry Association.

In 2009 the ITAA merged with the AeA (formerly the American Electronics Association) to form TechAmerica. Hank Steininger was the last ITAA board chair prior to the merger.

== Surveys ==
ITAA conducted surveys of CIOs.

== Real ID ==
ITAA actively lobbied on behalf of the funding for the Real ID.

Some have asserted that Real ID will turn state driver's licenses into a national identity card and impose numerous new burdens on taxpayers, citizens, immigrants, and state governments – while doing nothing to protect against terrorism. As a result, it is stirring intense opposition from many groups across the political spectrum. Critics have claimed that ITAA supports the national ID card because its member companies would benefit financially from implementing the card.

== Publications ==
ITAA published a series of newsletters, beginning with ADAPSO News in the early 1960s. Its last regular newsletter, the ITAA E-LETTER, covered issues of the networked economy, including information and telecommunications public policy, and the businesses of electronic commerce, Internet service and enhanced telecommunications service providers. The ITAA E-LETTER was distributed free of charge by electronic mail.

Other ADAPSO and ITAA publications included ADAPSO Agenda (later ITAA Agenda), Computer Services: Official Journal of the Association of Data Processing Service Organizations, and Data.
