= Arthur Rock =

American businessman and venture capitalist (born 1926)

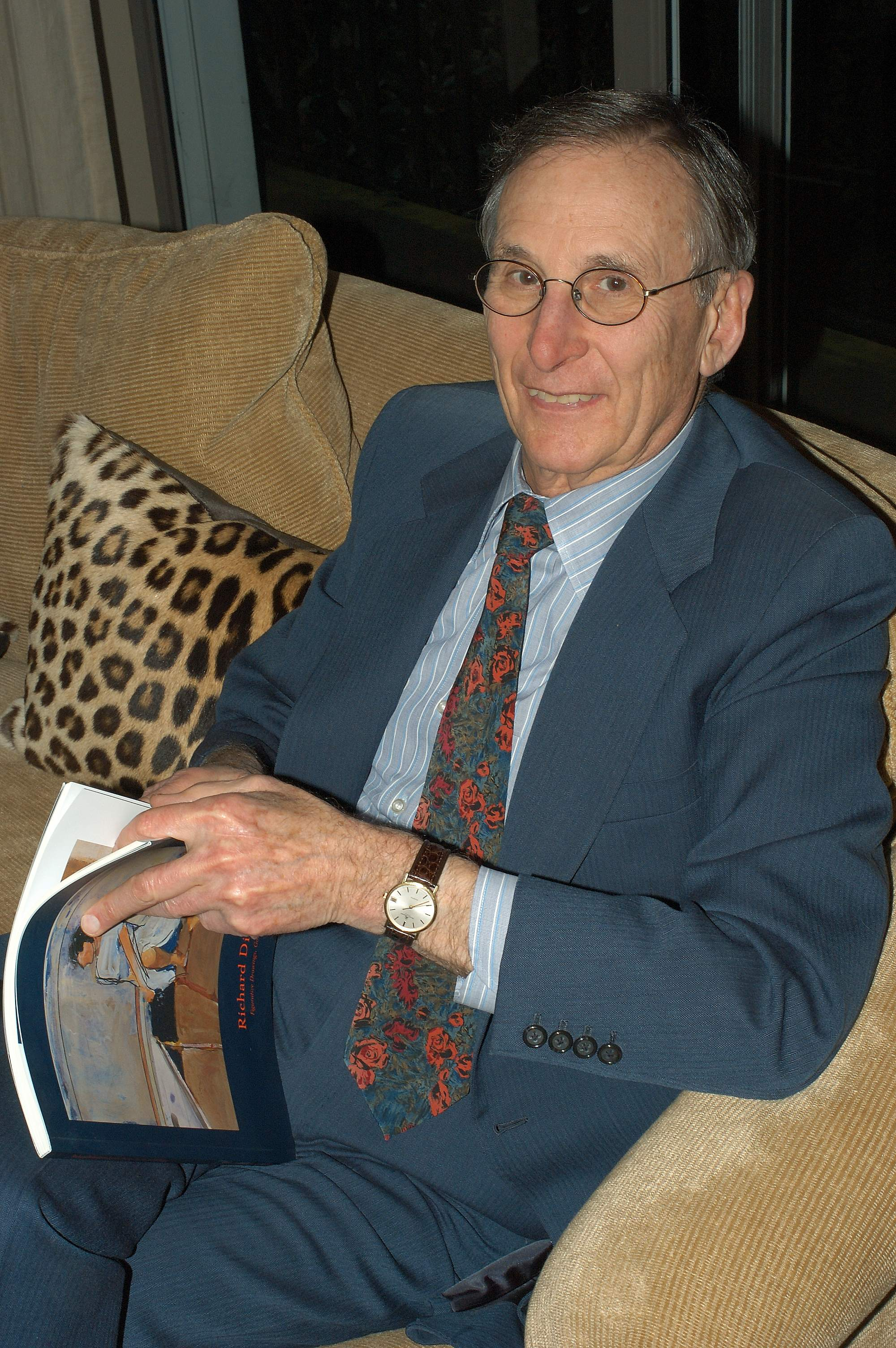
- Rock in 2003
- Born: August 19, 1926 (age 100); Rochester, New York, U.S.
- Education: Syracuse University (BA); Harvard University (MBA)
- Occupation: Venture capitalist
- Known for: Early investor in Intel and Apple Computer
- Spouse: Toni Rembe

Arthur Rock (born August 19, 1926) is an American businessman and investor. The founder of Davis & Rock, he was an early investor in major firms including Intel, Apple, Scientific Data Systems and Teledyne.

== Early life ==
Rock was born and raised in Rochester, New York. He was an only child and his father owned a small candy store where Rock worked in his youth. He joined the U.S. Army during World War II but the war ended before he was deployed. He then went to college on the G.I. Bill. He graduated with a bachelor's degree in business administration from Syracuse University in 1948 and earned an MBA from Harvard Business School in 1951.

== Career ==
Rock started his career in 1951 as a securities analyst in New York City, and then joined the corporate finance department of Hayden, Stone & Company in New York, where he focused on raising money for small high-technology companies. In 1957, when the "traitorous eight" left Shockley Semiconductor Laboratory, Rock was the one who helped them find a place to go: he convinced Sherman Fairchild to start Fairchild Semiconductor.

In 1961, he moved to California. Along with Thomas J. Davis Jr., he formed the San Francisco venture capital firm Davis & Rock.

In 1968, Robert Noyce, Gordon Moore, and another Fairchild employee named Andy Grove, were ready to start a new company, Intel. Noyce contacted his good friend Rock, with whom he used to hike and camp. Rock described how Intel started:

Bob [Noyce] just called me on the phone. We'd been friends for a long time.… Documents? There was practically nothing. Noyce's reputation was good enough. We put out a page-and-a-half little circular, but I'd raised the money even before people saw it.

Intel was incorporated in Mountain View, California, on July 18, 1968, by chemist Gordon E. Moore (known for "Moore's law"), Robert Noyce, a physicist and co-inventor of the integrated circuit. Of the original 500,000 shares, Noyce held 245,000, Moore 245,000, and Rock 10,000; all at $1 per share. Rock raised $2.5 million of convertible debentures from a limited group of private investors in one day. Rock became Intel's first chairman.

In 1978, Mike Markkula of Apple Computer connected Rock with Steve Jobs and Steve Wozniak. Rock bought 640,000 shares of Apple Computer and became a long-time director of the company.

Rock's investments and personal guidance helped launch and govern a roster of corporate firms including Intel, Apple, Scientific Data Systems, Teledyne, Xerox, Argonaut Insurance, AirTouch, the Nasdaq Stock Market, and Echelon Corporation.

== Venture capital ==
During the 1950s, putting a venture capital deal together may have required the help of two or three other organizations to complete the transaction. It was a business that was growing very rapidly, and as the business grew, the transactions grew exponentially. Rock, one of the pioneers of Silicon Valley during his venturing the Fairchild Semiconductor is often credited with the introduction of the term "venture capitalist" that has since become widely accepted. In 2008, he became a billionaire, according to Forbes.

== Rock's law ==
Rock's law or Moore's second law, named for Arthur Rock and Gordon Moore, says that the cost of a semiconductor chip fabrication plant doubles every four years. As of 2023, the price had already reached about US$20 billion.

Rock's law can be seen as the economic flip side to Moore's (first) law – that the number of transistors in a dense integrated circuit doubles every two years. The latter is a direct consequence of the ongoing growth of the capital-intensive semiconductor industry— innovative and popular products mean more profits, meaning more capital available to invest in ever higher levels of large-scale integration, which in turn leads to the creation of even more innovative products.

== Philanthropy ==
In 2003, Rock donated $25 million to the Harvard Business School to establish the Arthur Rock Center for Entrepreneurship. He and his wife Toni founded the Arthur & Toni Rembe Rock Center for Corporate Governance at Stanford University. Mr. Rock was co-founder and past president of The Basic Fund which gives scholarships to inner city children to attend K-8 private schools. He is also on the board of Teach for America and Children's Scholarship Fund and an active funder of KIPP

Rock has donated to many political causes, especially in the area of education. He has donated to more than 30 school board elections across the country. In 2021, he donated over $500,000 to the 2022 San Francisco Board of Education recall elections.

== Awards ==
- 2007 Achievement in Business, Corporate, and Philanthropic Leadership of the American Academy of Arts & Sciences
- 2002 Business Leader of the Year, Harvard Business School Association of Northern California
- 2001 Visionary Award, Software Development Forum
- 1999 Private Equity Hall of Fame
- 1999 Lifetime Achievement in Entrepreneurship & Innovation Award of the University of California
- 1997 Arents Award of Syracuse University
- 1995 California Business Hall of Fame
- 1989 Golden Plate Award of the American Academy of Achievement
- 1987 EY Entrepreneur of The Year Award Recipient, Northern California Region
- Medal of Achievement of the American Electronics Association
- Junior Achievement Hall of Fame
- Bay Area Business Council Hall of Fame

== Personal life ==
He was married to lawyer Toni Rembe. Together with his wife, Rock has been a supporter of Teach for America. The organization's annual Social Innovation Award is named in their honor.

Rock was portrayed by actor J. K. Simmons in the 2013 biographical drama Jobs.

== See also ==
- Triumph of the Nerds
