= Thomas J. Davis Jr. =

American venture capitalist

Thomas Jefferson Davis Jr.
- Born: 1912; Cincinnati, Ohio
- Died: 1989 (aged 76–77)
- Education: Harvard University
- Occupation: Founder of Mayfield Fund
- Spouse: Shirley Ross
- Children: 6
- Awards: EY Entrepreneur of the Year Award in the Northern California Region (1987)

Thomas Jefferson Davis Jr. (1912–1989) was an American businessman and investor. He was an early Silicon Valley venture capitalist and founder of the Mayfield Fund.

== Early life ==
He was born in 1912 in Cincinnati, Davis earned his A.B. and J.D. degrees from Harvard University and served in World War II on the War Production Board, the Lend-Lease Administration and in the Office of Strategic Services as an Army captain. He was often behind Japanese lines, as detailed in his 223-page privately published book One Man's War.

== Career ==
Davis was the Vice President of Kern County Land Company from 1957 to 1961. He managed its investment in four new companies including Watkins-Johnson Company, which investment of $900,000 was sold in 1968 and 1973 by Tenneco, successor to Kern, for over $80 million.

With Arthur Rock, he formed the Davis and Rock partnership in 1961, which made many hugely successful investments including Teledyne, Apple Computer and Intel. With Wally Davis and Stanford University, he formed in 1969 another partnership, Mayfield Fund, which also brought great returns not only to its limited partners, but also to Stanford. This fund helped start more than 125 companies in high-technology fields.

He died in 1989 before the book was compiled by Jeff McNish and published.

== Personal life ==
He lived in Woodside, California. He was married to the former Shirley Ross. Tommy had six daughters and 11 grandchildren. He also had a sister, Virginia Loomis of Oyster Bay and a brother, Laurence, of Homosassa, Florida.

== Awards ==
In 1987, Davis was an Award Recipient for the EY Entrepreneur of the Year Award in the Northern California Region.
