= James C. Bliss =

American electrical engineer (1933–2012)

- Born: October 21, 1933; Fort Worth, Texas, U.S.
- Died: January 24, 2012 (aged 78)
- Education: Northwestern University; Stanford University; Massachusetts Institute of Technology
- Employers: SRI International; Telesensory Systems
- Awards: Migel Medal Award of the American Foundation for the Blind

James C. Bliss (October 21, 1933 – January 24, 2012) was an American electrical engineer and entrepreneur best known for his pioneering role in developing technological aids for visually impaired people.

== Education and technical research ==
Born in Fort Worth, Texas, Jim Bliss grew up in Oklahoma City and Chicago. He received his B.S.E.E. degree from Northwestern University in 1956 and began working at Stanford Research Institute (SRI) in Menlo Park, California, while enrolled in graduate school at Stanford University. He received his M.S.E.E. from Stanford (1958) and his Ph.D. from Massachusetts Institute of Technology (1961). He returned to SRI where he became head of the Bio-Information Systems Group. He continued his dissertation work in tactile communication and also lectured in EE at Stanford, where he met John Linvill, who had conceived a machine that would allow his blind daughter, Candy, to read ordinary print by translating the letter images into vibrations. In 1962 Bliss and Linvill began a multi-year development effort at Stanford and SRI culminating in a successful prototype called the "Optacon" in 1969.

== Business development ==
To commercialize the Optacon, Bliss and Linvill founded Telesensory Systems, Inc. in 1970. Bliss left his position of associate professor at Stanford and became president of TSI, which position he held from the company's beginning until 1992. Under his leadership the company developed, manufactured, and sold many innovative electronics communications products for blind and visually impaired people. In 1994 he founded JBliss Imaging Systems, which provided easy-to-use equipment for scanning and reading aloud printed materials.

Jim Bliss retired in 2005; he died of multiple myeloma on January 24, 2012.

== Publications and awards ==
James C. Bliss published more than a dozen technical papers. In 2007 he received the Migel Medal Award of the American Foundation for the Blind.
