= TechAmerica =

American trade association (2009–2014)

- Type: Non-profit subsidiary
- Industry: Technology
- Predecessor: America Electronics Association, Cyber Security Industry Alliance, Government Electronics & Information Technology Association, and the Information Technology Association of America
- Founded: 2009
- Headquarters: Arlington County, Virginia, United States
- Area served: United States
- Products: Advocating before decision-makers at the state, federal, and international levels of government
- Services: Delivering business intelligence and networking opportunities to its members
- Owner: CompTIA (Since 2014)
- Website: www.comptia.org

TechAmerica was an American technology trade association that was created in 2009, through the merger of several American trade associations including the AeA and Information Technology Association of America.

In May 2014, CompTIA, a nonprofit trade association that serves information technology professionals, announced it had acquired TechAmerica in a move to expand its public-sector presence. TechAmerica has since become the public policy unit of CompTIA.

== History ==
In 2009, TechAmerica was formed from the merger of AeA (formerly known as the American Electronics Association), the Cyber Security Industry Alliance (CSIA), the Government Electronics & Information Technology Association (GEIA), and the Information Technology Association of America (ITAA) in 2009.

=== American Electronics Association (AeA) ===
AeA started as the West Coast Electronics Manufacturing Association (WCEMA), formed by David Packard and 25 of Hewlett-Packard's suppliers in 1943. Within 20 years, the association had gathered over 200 members. In 1969, WCEMA was rebranded the Western Electronic Manufacturers Association (WEMA). Less than two years following that rebranding, membership reached to over 600. Once again, the association was renamed in 1977 to the American Electronics Association. In 2001, the branding was shortened to AeA.

=== Information Technology Association of America (ITAA) ===
The Association of Data Processing Services Organization (ADAPSO) was formed in 1961. This association was renamed in 1991 to the Information Technology Association of America (ITAA). In 2008, ITAA merged with the Cyber Security Industry Alliance (CSIA) and the Government Electronics Industry Association (GEIA).

=== 2012 Cyber Attack ===
The organization's website was attacked in April 2012 for their support of the controversial CISPA bill.

=== Sale of standards program ===
In July 2013, TechAmerica sold its standards program to SAE International.

=== Four lobbyists depart, TechAmerica sues for breach of employee contract ===
On November 4, 2013 it was announced that four TechAmerica lobbyists: Trey Hodgkins, Pam Walker, Erica McCann and Carol Henton had resigned, lured to the Information Technology Industry Council (ITI) which was able to raise $50,000 each from more than a dozen of its members to fund the acquisition of the four TechAmerica lobbyists.

TechAmerica filed a lawsuit against ITI and three of the departing lobbyists in D.C. Superior Court. TechAmerica's complaints include that the defecting lobbyists conspired in their new positions to use old contacts and other information acquired while at TechAmerica to help ITI find new clients for its neophyte effort focused on government procurement

== Locations ==
- Washington, DC (Headquarters)
- Silicon Valley
- Shanghai, China
- Brussels, Belgium

== Publications ==
- Cyberstates - A report which quantifies the high-tech industry on a state-by-state basis in the United States.
- Competitiveness Series - Reports covering relevant issues within the high-tech industry and U.S. competitiveness.
