= James Bliss (politician) =

Alabama state legislator

James Bliss (1820 - April 17, 1891) was a broom maker, carpenter, and state legislator in Alabama. He represented Sumter County, Alabama in the Alabama House of Representatives. He served in 1874.

He was born in Virginia.

Masked men went to his home in Hale County, Alabama while he was out, and he reportedly fled the area as a result. The account was disputed.
