= John G. Linvill =

American professor of electrical engineering

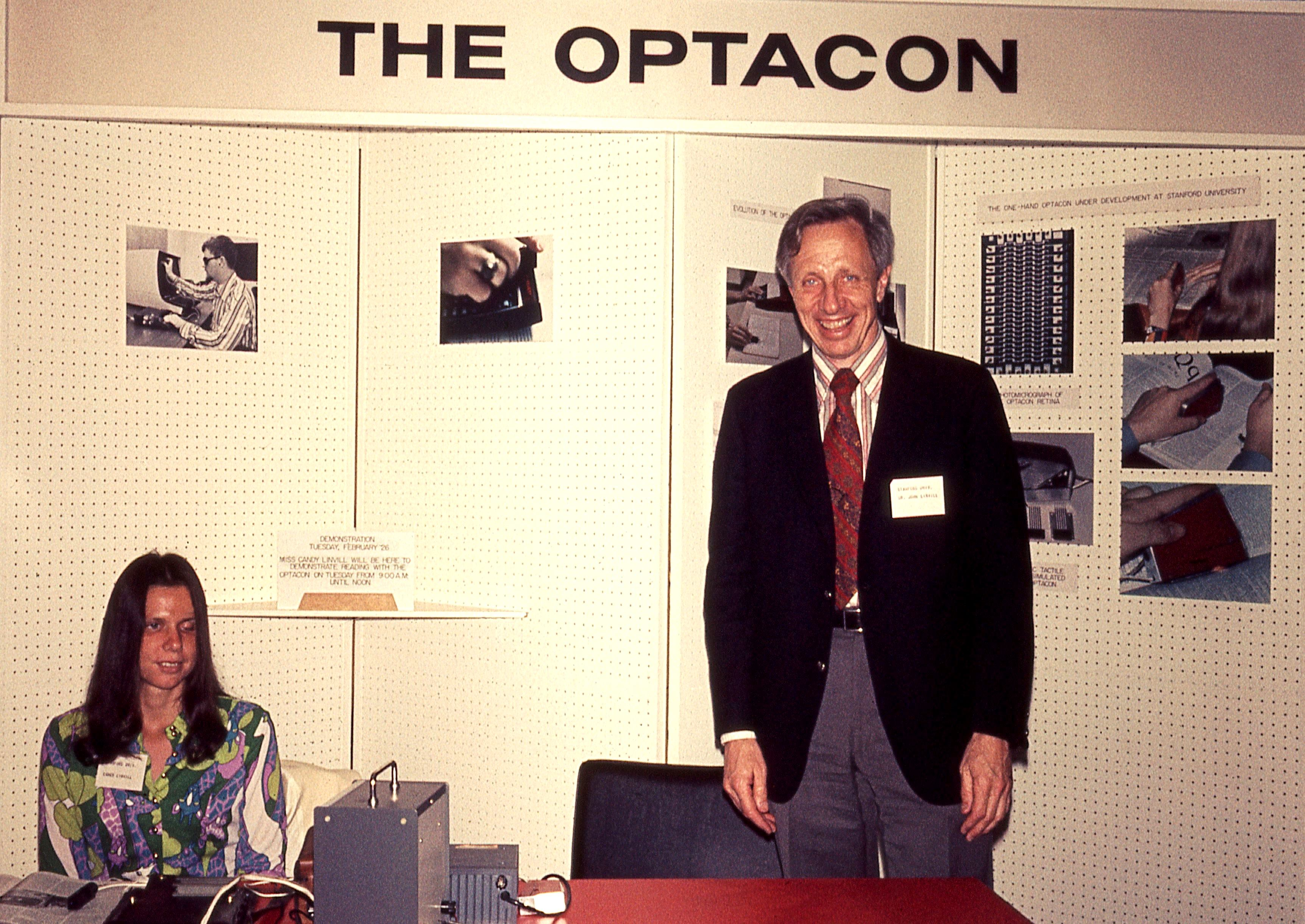
- Linvill with his daughter Candy demonstrating the Optacon in 1974
- Born: August 8, 1919
- Died: February 19, 2011 (aged 91)
- Education: Massachusetts Institute of Technology
- Scientific career
- Fields: Electrical engineering
- Workplaces: Stanford University
- Doctoral advisor: Ernst Guillemin

John G. Linvill (August 8, 1919 – February 19, 2011) was an American professor (emeritus) of Electrical engineering at Stanford University, known for his pioneering work in higher education, integrated circuits and semiconductors, and for development of the Optacon reading machine for the blind.

== Early life and education ==
Linvill and his identical twin brother William went to the same universities. Linvill received his A.B. in mathematics in 1941 from William Jewell College, and his B.S., M.S., and Sc.D. from Massachusetts Institute of Technology in 1943, 1945, and 1949 respectively.

== Career ==
He worked at Bell Telephone Laboratories from 1951 to 1955, when he joined the Stanford Electrical Engineering department. In 1969 he was appointed head of the EE department, and in 1979 he became Director of the Center for Integrated Systems at Stanford. His teaching and research concentrated on active circuits, transistors, and models of semiconductors.

In 1962, Linvill conceived the Optacon (Optical-to-Tactile Converter) as a means to allow his blind daughter, Candy, to read ordinary print. He sparked the technical development of the device, which required innovations in integrated circuit technology developed under his leadership at Stanford. In 1970 he, Jim Bliss, and others from Stanford and SRI co-founded Telesensory Systems (TSI) to manufacture and distribute the Optacon.

John Linvill was chairman of the board of TSI, served on the boards of other Silicon Valley corporations, and led technical committees for the National Research Council, NASA, and the IEEE. He holds eleven U.S. patents.

He died February 19, 2011.

== Honors and awards ==
- Fellow, IEEE
- elected member National Academy of Engineering (1971)
- American Academy of Arts and Sciences
- IEEE Education Medal (1976)
- John G. McAulay Award from the American Association of Workers for the Blind (1979)
- John Scott Award from the Board of Directors of City Trusts of Philadelphia (1980), for the invention of the Optacon.
- Medal of Achievement from the American Electronics Association (1983)
- David Packard Medal of Achievement (1983)
