= Video magnifier =

Electronic device used for optical magnification

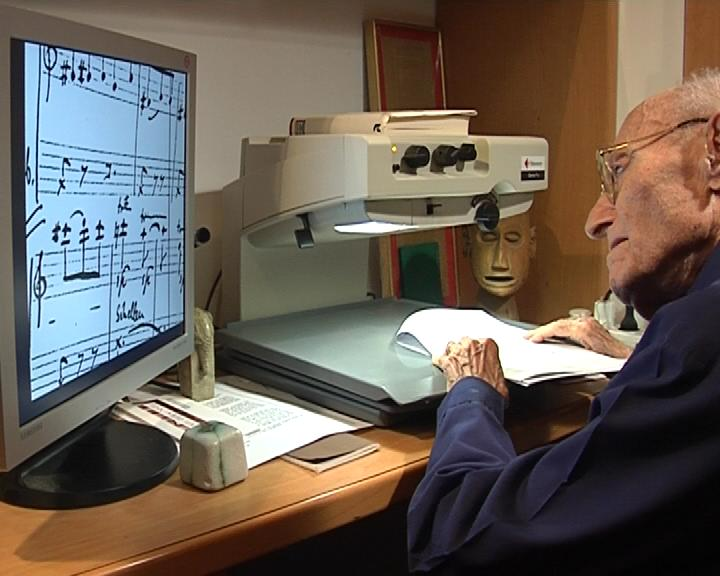

Video magnifiers are electronic devices that use a camera and a display screen to perform digital magnification of printed materials. The display screen is usually LCD or a similar flat-screen technology (although older video magnifiers have used CRT displays), and the device usually includes a lamp to illuminate the source material. Video magnifiers are designed to be mostly used by people with low vision that cannot be helped using a conventional magnifying glass.

== Advantages ==
=== Magnification range and display size ===
The main benefit of a video magnifier over purely optical magnification is that the video magnifier allows greater magnification across a larger field of view. With optical lenses, the field of meaningful, in-focus view is reduced with increased magnification. Thus, while a "full page magnifier" based on a fresnel lens can span some 625 cm^{2} (96.9 sq in) (A4), it typically achieves no more than 1.4x magnification (advertised as "2x" if measured by area instead of the scale factor); an aspheric segment hand magnifier can achieve a scale factor in excess of two (area factor in excess of four) but typically measures no more than 10 cm × 3 cm (3.9 in × 1.2 in), and higher magnification factors require conventional lenses that focus on a very small area. A video magnifier however is limited only by its display size and its electronics; video magnifiers that can be switched between 2 and 50 times magnification are common, and displays can range from smartphone-sized to TV-sized.

=== Image processing ===
Most video magnifiers can automatically focus the image, and the more advanced models are capable of further electronic image processing to change the colours, enhance the contrast, and/or assist in the tracking of images. Some can be set to save "snapshots" of previously seen images.

== Disadvantages ==
=== Power requirements ===
Video magnifiers require power, either via mains electricity or from a battery. This may make battery life an issue if the magnifier is required for an extended period of time away from power, whereas a purely optical magnification device could be used indefinitely without needing to be connected to power.

=== Non-portability of the larger models ===
Very large video magnifiers are not typically portable, but they can still be used in home installations, libraries and classrooms. Some of these models are informally referred to as CCTV magnifiers.

=== Pricing ===
As of 2013, video magnifiers are typically several times more expensive than optical-only magnifiers.

== Software video magnifiers ==
Due to the high cost of dedicated-hardware video magnifiers, there has been some interest in software video magnification running on smartphones such as iPhone and Android, tablets such as iPad, and laptops with suitably-mounted camera peripherals. Software magnifiers might not achieve the same quality as a good hardware video magnifier, and if used extensively they might exhaust the battery quickly, but if the user already has a smartphone, tablet or laptop then software magnification can be more economical than obtaining a separate hardware video magnifier.
