= AeA =

Technology trade association (1943–2009)

- Type: Non-profit
- Founded: 1943
- Defunct: 2009
- Successor: TechAmerica
- Headquarters: USA

The AeA (formerly the American Electronics Association) was a nationwide non-profit trade association that represented all segments of the technology industry. It lobbied governments at the state, federal, and international levels; provided access to capital and business opportunities; and offered select business services and networking programs. AEA Councils, in Tech Centers nationwide, began forming in 1977, after the board of directors approved the nationwide expansion. Membership exploded to 3,000 from high tech centers from Boston to California.

In 2008, the AeA merged with the Information Technology Association of America (ITAA) to form TechAmerica.

== History ==
AeA was founded in 1943 by David Packard and 25 of Hewlett-Packard's suppliers to help lobby for government contracts. It was originally named the West Coast Electronic Manufacturers Association (WCEMA). In 1969, WCEMA changed its name to the Western Electronic Manufacturers Association (WEMA) to reflect the growing membership outside California. In 1977, the association once again changed its name to the American Electronics Association, in an effort to more accurately represent its 750 members nationwide. With the addition of an experienced CEO and EVP’s the association grew to 3000 members from Tech Centers throughout the USA, Japan and Europe. With the internet age at the turn of the century, a final name change occurred in 2001, as the American Electronics Association was shortened to AeA with the tagline "Advancing the Business of Technology."

AeA had 18 offices across the United States, and had two international offices in Brussels and Tokyo. AeA had nearly 3,000 corporate members (and the 1.8 million employees they represent nationwide) at the time of the merger. The membership was drawn from a wide range of high tech sectors, including the aerospace/defense, business related services, computers, medical equipment, semiconductors/electronic components, software, and telecommunications industries.

Since 1959, AeA has awarded an annual Medal of Achievement to a recipient selected for contributions and advances within the high-tech industry, their community, and humankind.

AeA also produced an annual Cyberstates report which quantifies the high-tech industry on a state-by-state basis in the United States.

On September 11, 2008, The Boards of Directors of weakened AeA and the Information Technology Association of America (ITAA) announced that they are in discussions to merge the trade associations’ memberships and programs.

On December 9, 2008, the Boards of Directors of AeA and ITAA announced that they have each approved the merger of the two trade associations' memberships and programs. The combined associations became TechAmerica (The Technology Association of America) on January 1, 2009.

== Chair & Board of Directors ==
Peter J. Boni is the Chairperson of the AeA Board of Directors and the president and CEO of Safeguard Scientifics, Inc.

As president and chief executive officer of Safeguard, Peter J. Boni is responsible for developing and executing Safeguard’s corporate strategy.

In addition to acting as CEO for several publicly traded and privately held companies, he has served as a chairman, a Fortune 500 corporate executive, a NYSE Fortune 1000 president, a management consultant, board member, investor and advisor to institutional investors in both early- and later-stage hardware, software and technology-enabled services firms. After his CEO experience, Peter served as an Operating Partner at Advent International, a leading global private equity firm managing $10 billion.

Select companies represented on the Board include Agilent, Citrix, Intel, Microsoft, Motorola, Symantec, and Xerox.

== Senior staff at the time of the merger ==
President & Chief Executive Officer
Christopher Hansen

Financial Operations
Samuel J. Block
Vice President/Controller

Government Affairs
Robert J. Mulligan
Senior Vice President International

Legal
Benjamin Aderson
Association Counsel and Secretary

Operations
Matthew Kazmierczak
Senior Vice President, Operations

Services
Elaine Sanders
Senior Vice President for Financial Conferences, Executive Education, and Affinity Programs

Eric Meyer
Senior Vice President for Insurance Programs

== AeA's Regional Offices ==
AeA's main offices were located in Washington, DC and in Silicon Valley, CA. AeA had a total network of 18 offices across the country and two overseas.
