= SoftKey =

Software company (1986–1999)

SoftKey International
- Trade name: The Learning Company (1995–1999)
- Founded: 1986; 40 years ago (as SoftKey Software Products)
- Founders: Kevin O'Leary
- Defunct: 1999; 27 years ago
- Fate: Acquired by Mattel and folded into Mattel Interactive
- Successors: Mattel Interactive; Riverdeep Interactive Learning; Software MacKiev
- Headquarters: United States
- Products: Educational software games

SoftKey International (originally SoftKey Software Products, Inc.) was a software company founded by Kevin O'Leary in 1986 in Toronto, Ontario. It was known as the Learning Company from 1995 to 1999 after acquiring the Learning Company and taking its name.

SoftKey played a major role in the dissolution of the edutainment industry by the turn of the millennium. Contributing factors include its reduction of the market price by releasing shovelware discs of freeware and shareware, hostile takeovers of major edutainment software companies, reduction of these acquisitions to a skeleton staff, and questionable financial practices to maintain its stock price.

In 1999, the company was acquired by Mattel in what Businessweek called one of "the Worst Deals of All Time". It was subsequently folded into Mattel Interactive, Riverdeep Interactive Learning, and Software MacKiev.

== Products ==
SoftKey published and distributed CD-ROM-based personal computer software for Windows and Macintosh computers during the late 1980s and 1990s. Its lineup consisted of software intended for home audiences, specifically shovelware discs containing various freeware or shareware game software. The company enjoyed great success by offering "jewel-case only" products, dubbed its "Platinum" line.

As a home and small office software publisher, SoftKey bought the rights to application packages from their authors and distributed them under its own "Key" label. By late 1992, SoftKey was distributing 35 different products in this manner. SoftKey began to develop its own software by 1994, and had branched out to include edutainment games and CD-ROMs in its line of products.

In 1986, SoftKey released specialized graphics package KeyChart for the IBM PC and compatibles, designed to make time-consuming plotting easier. In 1993, it was selling KeyMap, a DOS-only software that offered maps, route planning, and a database tool for annotating maps. Around this time, Computer Associates acquired Easy Tax (DOS) from SoftKey and sold it as Simply Tax.

SoftKey's acquisition of the Learning Company added the Reader Rabbit and Math Rabbit educational video games to its collection. Its acquisition of MECC added The Oregon Trail, Word Munchers, Number Munchers and Storybook Weaver. With the acquisition of Broderbund, it obtained multiple award-winning brands including Carmen Sandiego, The Print Shop, Living Books, Family Tree Maker, Arthur, and KidPix.

== Marketing ==
According to founder Kevin O'Leary, SoftKey's business model focused on marketing its retail software products similarly to consumer goods. The company was one of the few to rent store space to manage distribution directly. O'Leary emphasized offering retailers a diverse range of titles to mitigate risk and ensure a specific sales volume in exchange for allocated shelf space.

SoftKey introduced innovations such as revolving racks for software packaged in standard CD jewel cases, enabling more efficient product displays. The company expanded software sales from niche markets to general retail locations, including Office Depot, Radio Shack, Willson Stationers, and SmithBooks. Its strategy relied on uniform packaging and visually appealing graphics to attract customers.

By October 1995, SoftKey operated in 10 cities across Europe, Asia, Canada, and the United States. Its products were available in over 18,000 retail outlets, including grocery stores and airport gift shops, and distributed in 47 countries.

== Pricing ==
SoftKey's pricing strategy was to prioritize the number of copies sold over the price per unit. As such, SoftKey listed its titles for lower prices, generally between $40 and $100, with minimum profit. The Christian Science Monitor stated that the move could "transform the industry," leading to lower software prices but more variety in the types of stores that sell software.

The corporate mission of SoftKey International, Inc. was "to be the leading electronic publisher of value-priced consumer software-worldwide." One analyst dubbed its products "coasterware", since they were so cheap that "if you don't like the actual software you can use the CD-ROMs as drink coasters".

O'Leary wanted to "produce products to service that 40 percent of the market that hasn't bought educational software because of pricing issues." He stated, "In the last two years, we've moved from an industry that sells primarily to businesses to an industry that's going through a violent change to become a commodity.''

The company became known for aggressively driving down the development costs of products and laying off employees of the companies it acquired. Casey Dworkin, publisher of Retail Price Week, said that SoftKey appeals to companies that want to "sell software by the pound, appealing to impulse purchases by customers who are intrigued but don't want to drop $40 for a piece of software." They compared SoftKey's practices to a laundry-detergent maker marketing a premium-brand version, a lower-end brand, and a generic version of the same product.

SoftKey built a business by acquiring struggling software companies, repackaging and repricing its products. "SoftKey believes that much consumer software is overpriced and therefore cannot reach a broad market. It's a philosophy that clashes with the artistic sensibilities of many in the multimedia software business—but is nonetheless likely to become increasingly influential in the volatile software world."

== Profit ==
SoftKey Software Products was the fastest growing company in Canada in 1992, with sales of $36.8 million and profit of $6.1 million. Its most profitable products were its tax-software and processing service. By April 1995, SoftKey's stock was valued at $25.50, about 20 times the year's earnings. A public offering of 2.3 million common shares was priced at $28.875.

SoftKey products were sold in more than 19,000 stores in over 40 countries In June of that year, Montgomery Securities raised more than $60 million for the company. In October, SoftKey raised another $350 million in an unrated private offering. On November 28, 1995, SoftKey rose from 3.2 million to 4.7 million shares, the largest increase in open positions among Nasdaq issues.

In August 1998, the stock exchange halted trading in the Learning Company, as the company issued a statement to clear up questions about its accounting practices. Shares of the Learning Company (NYSE: TLC) fell 1 15/16 to 26 3/8 and Mattel (NYSE: MAT) plunged 20 percent to 23 11/16. The company continued to grow, with revenue of $800 million despite an accumulated deficit of $1.1 billion by the end of 1998.

== History ==
In 1986, Canadian businessman and investor Kevin O'Leary along with John Freeman started SoftKey Software Products, Inc. in O'Leary's basement with a loan of $10,000 from his mother. He convinced other companies to bundle SoftKey's products with their own, later licensing software from other firms, which proved more cost-effective than internal development.

In 1993, SoftKey International was created out of a three-way merger between SoftKey Software Products, WordStar International, and Spinnaker Software. Shareholders of Softkey Software represented about 53 percent of the new company's shares. After the merger, the company moved to Spinnaker's offices in Cambridge, Mass.

=== Acquisitions ===
==== MECC and the Learning Company ====
Logo of SoftKey post–Learning Company acquisition

In October 1995, SoftKey initiated a bidding war against Broderbund for Learning Company, launching a hostile offer valued at $606 million. SoftKey also announced it had agreed to buy the Minnesota Educational Computing Corporation (MECC) for $370 million, throwing a wrench into Broderbund's offer. O'Leary commented, "They're working on the economics of yesterday", stating that "Learning's premium-priced products were out of step with trends in the market."

After the acquisition of the Learning Company, SoftKey changed its name to "The Learning Company". A substantial percentage of the staff were let go, reducing it to a skeleton staff. MECC' senior vice president of product development Susan Schilling stated: "[O'Leary] had an interest in earning money. I'm not sure he had a desire to help children learn."

==== Acquisitions from 1994 to 1998 ====
On September 14, 1994, SoftKey acquired privately held Software Marketing Corp., Phoenix, for about 600,000 shares of SoftKey common stock and the assumption of $1.6 million in long-term debt.

On November 30, 1995, the original Learning Company announced that it had sued the Tribune Company for violating securities laws as a "strategic partner" of SoftKey International. The next day, SoftKey agreed to acquire Compton's New Media from Tribune for stock valued at $106.5 million. Compton's New Media was a publisher of encyclopedia CD-ROMs, and was originally a unit of Encyclopedia Britannica.

In 1996, SoftKey International acquired EduSoft, a French education software developer and publisher, for $14.3M USD.

In March 1998, Softkey, now called the Learning Company, acquired Mindscape Inc. from Pearson PLC for $150 million in cash and stock. Broderbund's Red Orb Entertainment was moved to Mindscape.

In June 1998, Learning Co. agreed to buy rival Broderbund Software Inc., publisher of the blockbuster game Myst, in a stock deal valued at about $416 million.

In December 1998, the Learning Company acquired Palladium Interactive.

According to Information technology consulting company Booz Allen Hamilton, two of SoftKey International's acquisition deals rank among the ten worst U.S. acquisitions during 1994–1996 as measured by shareholder value two years after the deal.

=== Sale to Mattel ===
In the fall of 1998, Mattel agreed to acquire the Learning Company in a stock-for-stock merger valuing the company at approximately $4.2 billion. The merger was finalized and unanimously approved by both companies' boards of directors on December 14. On May 7, 1999, shareholders of both companies voted to approve the merger. The merger was completed on May 13, 1999. Jill E. Barad, Mattel's chairman and chief executive officer stated "This merger gives Mattel a $1 billion software division with an unparalleled portfolio of branded content and profit margins exceeding that of our traditional business," The company was placed under Mattel's new Mattel Interactive division.

==== Aftermath ====
The sale proved to be fraught. A report from the Center for Financial Research and Analysis a few weeks after the merger highlighted the "lack of proper due diligence by Mattel during the Learning Co. acquisition," and listed numerous systemic problems with The Learning Company. A few weeks later O'Leary, who had been hired as president of Mattel's new TLC digital division, sold his stock in the company for $6 million. In the fourth quarter of 1999, Mattel reported a loss of $184 million, reportedly due to poor sales and inventory problems. The stock price valuation of Mattel dropped $2 billion in one day. Michael Perik and Kevin O'Leary, founders and heads of the Learning Co, left the company.

The Telegraph deemed it "one of the worst takeovers in recent history". Toy analyst Margaret Whitfield of Tucker Anthony Cleary Gull called it "a disaster for Mattel". Bloomberg, Businessweek, and CNBC all described it as one of the worst mergers of all time.

In January 2000, Mattel brought on software executive and former Sega of America president Bernie Stolar to assist with their financial troubles. On February 3, 2000 Chairman and CEO Jill E. Barad resigned from Mattel. The 1999 Annual Report began, "The bad news for 1999 unfortunately has overshadowed the good news. We are all painfully aware of the negative effect the acquisition of the Learning Company and its subsequent performance had on our results for 1999"

The acquisition saw the end of the mid-1990s edutainment boom. Former Learning Company educational design department manager, Toby Levenson, said that edutainment had become "a toxic word". Blake Montgomery of EdSurge wrote, "For many years, people making educational products didn't want them to be entertaining because that could be called "edutainment" and that would hurt your funding.”

=== Sale to Gores Technology Group ===
On April 3, 2000, Mattel announced its plan to dissolve its assets related to the software business. Gores Technology Group acquired the Learning Company for $27.3 million plus a profit-sharing agreement with Mattel, to create their entertainment, productivity and education divisions, which became GAME Studios, the Learning Company, and Broderbund respectively. GAME Studios was sold to Ubisoft in 2001. Gores subsequently sold most of the other holdings – including the edutainment series and the brand name the Learning Company – to Irish company Riverdeep Interactive Learning, which later became Houghton Mifflin Harcourt. Harcourt released several book sets under the Learning Company brand umbrella, including Oregon Trail Adventures, The Little Box of Love, and The Little Box of Laughs.

As of April 2018, Houghton Mifflin Harcourt has ceased using the Learning Company brand.

== List of acquisitions ==
- February 1994 – WordStar International and Spinnaker Software
- June 1994 – Aris Multimedia Entertainment
- July 1994 – Compact Publishing
- September 1995 – Software Marketing Corporation
- July 1995 – Tewi Verlag GmbH
- August 1995 – Future Vision Holding
- December 1995 – The Learning Company
- December 1995 – Compton's NewMedia
- Late 1995 – EduSoft
- May 1996 – Minnesota Educational Computing Corporation (MECC)
- October 1997 – Microsystems Software
- December 1997 – Creative Wonders
- March 1998 – Mindscape
- August 1998 – Broderbund

== Software titles ==
- 20,000 Leagues Under the Sea
- Air Power: The US Air Force in Action
- The American Heritage Talking Dictionary
- Angst: Rahz's Revenge
- ArtRageous: The Amazing World of Art
- Arthur's Reading Race
- Astrorock
- The Bible: A Multimedia Experience
- BodyWorks 5.0: the complete multimedia guide to human anatomy
- Comanche CD (Budget CD-ROM Release)
- Design It! 3-D
- DinoPark Tycoon
- Dr. Health'nstein's Body Fun
- Dr. Schueler's Home Medical Advisor Pro
- Dr. Seuss' ABC
- Earthworm Jim
- Explorers of the New World
- Falcon AT
- Flight of the Intruder
- Green Eggs and Ham
- The Hubble Space Telescope
- Infopedia
- JetStrike
- Just Grandma and Me
- KeyAccounting (also known as Painless Accounting)
- KeyCad Complete
- KeyChart
- KeyClipart series
- KeyDatabase Plus
- KeyFonts
- KeyMailer
- KeyPublisher
- The Koshan Conspiracy
- Labels Unlimited
- Lamborghini American Challenge
- Leonardo, the inventor
- Lynn Fischer's Healthy Indulgences
- Me and my world: Multimedia picture dictionary
- Megafortress & Patriot
- MPC Wizard
- Multipedia
- The Muppet Calendar
- The Oregon Trail: Classic Edition
- Oregon Trail II
- The Otter's Adventure
- Pocket and Tails Go Exploring
- PC PaintBrush Clipart Collection For Windows (ISBN 1-56434-687-0 )
- Pocket and Tails Go to Town
- Pro Landscaper 3-D
- Shadows of Cairn
- Shelley Duvall's Tales of Digby the Dog
- Silent Service II
- SoftKey Weekend
- Solitaire Antics
- Spanish to Go!
- Sports Illustrated Swimsuit Calendar
- Tom Kite Golf
- Troggle Trouble Math
- The Three Little Pigs
- WriteNow
- Wordstar for Windows 2
- War Wind II: Human Onslaught
