= Killer application =

Software term

A killer application (often shortened to killer app) or a system seller is any software that is so desirable that it significantly boosts the value proposition of its associated technology, such as its host computer hardware, software platform, or operating system. Consumers would buy the host platform just to access that application, possibly substantially increasing sales of its host platform.

== Usage ==
One mark of a good computer is the appearance of a piece of software specifically written for that machine that does something that, for a while at least, can only be done on that machine.

— Steven Levy, 1985

The earliest recorded use of the term "killer app" in print is in the May 24, 1988 issue of PC Week: "Everybody has only one killer application. The secretary has a word processor. The manager has a spreadsheet."

The definition of "killer app" came up during the deposition of Bill Gates in the United States v. Microsoft Corp. antitrust case. He had written an email in which he described Internet Explorer as a killer app. In the questioning, he said that the term meant "a popular application," and did not connote an application that would fuel sales of a larger product or one that would supplant its competition, as the Microsoft Computer Dictionary defined it.

Introducing the iPhone in 2007, Steve Jobs said that "the killer app is making calls". Reviewing the iPhone's first decade, David Pierce for Wired wrote that although Jobs prioritized a good experience making calls in the phone's development, other features of the phone soon became more important, such as its data connectivity and the later ability to install third-party software.

The World Wide Web (through the web browsers Mosaic and Netscape Navigator) is the killer app that popularized the Internet, as is the music sharing program Napster.

== Examples ==
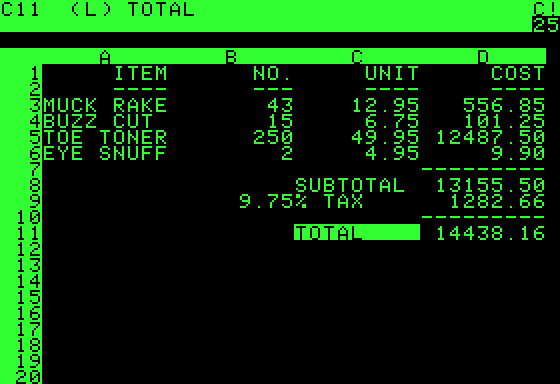
VisiCalc was released in 1979, becoming the earliest generally agreed-upon example of a killer application.

Although the term was coined in the late 1980s one of the first retroactively recognized examples of a killer application is the VisiCalc spreadsheet, released in 1979 for the Apple II. Because it was not released for other computers for 12 months, people spent US$100 (equivalent to $400 in 2025) for the software first, then $2,000 to $10,000 (equivalent to $9,000 to $44,000) on the requisite Apple II. Byte wrote in 1980, "VisiCalc is the first program available on a microcomputer that has been responsible for sales of entire systems", and Creative Computing's VisiCalc review is subtitled "reason enough for owning a computer". Others also chose to develop software, such as EasyWriter, for the Apple II first because of its higher sales, helping Apple defeat rivals Commodore International and Tandy Corporation.

The co-creator of WordStar, Seymour Rubinstein, argued that the honor of the first killer app should go to that popular word processor, given that it came out a year before VisiCalc and that it gave a reason for people to buy a computer. However, whereas WordStar could be considered an incremental improvement (albeit a large one) over smart typewriters like the IBM Electronic Selectric Composer, VisiCalc, with its ability to instantly recalculate rows and columns, introduced an entirely new paradigm and capability unavailable on larger computers.

Lotus 1-2-3 similarly benefited sales of the IBM PC. Noting that computer purchasers did not want PC compatibility as much as compatibility with certain PC software, InfoWorld suggested "let's tell it like it is. Let's not say 'PC compatible', or even 'MS-DOS compatible'. Instead, let's say '1-2-3 compatible'."

The UNIX Operating System became a killer application for the DEC PDP-11 and VAX-11 minicomputers during roughly 1975–1985. Many of the PDP-11 and VAX-11 processors never ran DEC's operating systems (RSTS or VAX/VMS), but instead, they ran UNIX, which was first licensed in 1975. To get a virtual-memory UNIX (BSD 3.0), requires a VAX-11 computer. Many universities wanted a general-purpose timesharing system that would meet the needs of students and researchers. Early versions of UNIX included free compilers for C, Fortran, and Pascal, at a time when offering even one free compiler was unprecedented. From its inception, UNIX drives high-quality typesetting equipment and later PostScript printers using the nroff/troff typesetting language, and this was also unprecedented. UNIX is the first operating system offered in source-license form (a university license cost only $10,000, less than a PDP-11), allowing it to run on an unlimited number of machines, and allowing the machines to interface to any type of hardware because the UNIX I/O system is extensible. As of 1985 Unix's lack of a killer app, however, prevented its widespread adoption by companies, industry analyst Jean Yates said: "I hope [Unix creator] AT&T will go down on its knees to Lotus".

=== Applications and operating systems ===
- 1979: Apple II: VisiCalc (first spreadsheet program and killer app)
- 1979: CP/M systems: WordStar
- 1982: WordStar ported to CP/M-86 and IBM PC compatible/MS-DOS
- 1983: IBM PC compatible/MS-DOS: Lotus 1-2-3 (spreadsheet)
- 1985: Macintosh: Microsoft Excel (first WYSIWYG spreadsheet) and Microsoft Word (WYSIWYG word processor), Aldus (now Adobe) PageMaker (first desktop publishing program)
- 1985: AmigaOS: Deluxe Paint, Video Toaster, Prevue Guide
- 1987/1989: Microsoft Excel and Microsoft Word ported to Microsoft Windows
- 1993: Acorn Archimedes: Sibelius

=== Video games ===
The term applies to video games that persuade consumers to buy a particular video game console or accessory, by virtue of platform exclusivity. Such a game is also called a "system seller".

- Space Invaders, originally released for arcades in 1978, became a killer app when it was ported to the Atari VCS console in 1980, quadrupling sales of the three-year-old console.
- Star Raiders, released in 1980, was the first killer app computer game. BYTE named it the single most important reason for sales of Atari 400 and 800 computers. Another was Eastern Front (1941), released in 1981.
- In 1996, Computer Gaming World wrote that Wizardry: Proving Grounds of the Mad Overlord (1981) "sent AD&D fans scrambling to buy Apple IIs".
- The Famicom home port of Xevious is considered the console's first killer app, which caused system sales to jump by nearly 2 million units.
- Computer Gaming World stated that The Legend of Zelda on the Nintendo Entertainment System, Phantasy Star II on the Sega Genesis, and Far East of Eden for the NEC TurboGrafx-16 were killer apps for their consoles.
- The Super Mario, Final Fantasy, and Dragon Quest series were killer apps for Nintendo's Famicom and Super Famicom consoles in Japan.
- John Madden Football's popularity in 1990 helped the Genesis gain market share against the Super NES in North America.
  - Sonic the Hedgehog, released in 1991, was hailed as a killer app as it revived sales of the three-year-old Genesis.
  - Mortal Kombat helped pushed the sales of the Genesis due to being uncensored unlike the Nintendo version.
  - Streets of Rage became a system seller for the Mega Drive/Genesis in the UK.
  - In Brazil, Show do Milhão, increased sales of the Mega Drive console by 20%.
  - In Sweden, Sega distributor Brio placed considerable emphasis on sports games to attract an older audience to the Mega Drive. By the early 1990s, sports titles accounted for approximately 25% of the console's software sales in the country, with Electronic Arts' ice hockey games proving particularly successful. Rolf Larsson, who operated Sega's Swedish customer-support service, later recalled that ice hockey games, alongside Sonic the Hedgehog, contributed to the sale of more than 150,000 Mega Drive consoles in Sweden.
- Street Fighter II, originally released for arcades in 1991, became a system-seller for the Super NES when it was ported to the platform in 1992.
  - Donkey Kong Country for the SNES helped Nintendo's comeback against Sega.
- Doom, released 1993, helped drive adoption of IBM PC compatibles as a major video gaming platform. By late 1995, it was estimated that Doom was installed on more computers than the Microsoft Windows operating system.
- Myst and The 7th Guest, both released in 1993, drove adoption of CD-ROM drives for personal computers.
- Virtua Fighter 2, Nights into Dreams, and Sakura Wars are the killer apps for the Sega Saturn.
  - Euro 96 and Sega Rally Championship are major system-sellers for the Sega Saturn in the United Kingdom, with the latter becoming the fastest selling CD game.
  - Dragon Ball Z: Legends served as a killer app for the Sega Saturn in Portugal.
  - Die Hard Arcade and Fighters Megamix boosted the Sega Saturn's sales in the United States.
- Ridge Racer, Tekken, Wipeout, Tomb Raider, and Crash Bandicoot are the killer apps for the PlayStation. Tomb Raider was released for the Sega Saturn first and for MS-DOS at the same time, but the games contributed substantially to the original PlayStation's early success.
  - Final Fantasy VII is another killer app for the PlayStation. Computing Japan magazine said that it was largely responsible for the PlayStation's global installed base increasing 60% from 10 million units sold by November 1996 to 16 million units sold by May 1997.
- Super Mario 64 and GoldenEye 007 are the killer apps for the Nintendo 64.
- Virtua Fighter 3, Sonic Adventure, and The House of the Dead 2 are the killer apps for the Dreamcast.
  - NFL 2K is a killer app for the Dreamcast in the United States.
  - Italian publication Everyeye retrospectively described Virtua Tennis as a "killer application" for the Dreamcast, noting the game's considerable commercial success.
  - Hobby Consolas credited Soulcalibur with helping boost Dreamcast sales in Spain.
- Gran Turismo 3 and the Grand Theft Auto games are the killer apps for the PlayStation 2.
- Star Wars Rogue Squadron II: Rogue Leader, Super Smash Bros. Melee, and Super Mario Sunshine are the killer apps for the GameCube.
- Halo: Combat Evolved, Halo 2, Project Gotham Racing and Dead or Alive 3 are the killer apps for the Xbox. The subsequent Halo series entries became killer apps for the Xbox 360 and Xbox One.
  - Many video game and technology critics call Xbox Live a more general killer app for the Xbox.
  - Dead or Alive 4, the Forza, Gears of War and Mass Effect series are also killer apps for the Xbox 360.
  - Blue Dragon and Dead or Alive 4 were killer apps for the Xbox 360 in Japan.
- Wii Sports is the killer app for the Wii.
- Metal Gear Solid 4: Guns of the Patriots boosted PlayStation 3 sales.
- Mario Kart 8 is a killer app for the Wii U in the UK.
- The Legend of Zelda: Breath of the Wild is a killer app for the Nintendo Switch.
- Half-Life: Alyx is a killer app for virtual reality headsets, as the first true AAA virtual reality game. Sales of VR headsets such as the Valve Index increased dramatically after its announcement, suggesting users bought the product specifically for the game.
- Microsoft Flight Simulator was called a killer app for Xbox Game Studios's Xbox Game Pass subscription, and the Xbox Series X/S.
  - Microsoft's acquisition of Bethesda Softworks in 2021 was seen as providing several potential killer app games for the Xbox Series X/S, notably Starfield from Bethesda Game Studios, which in addition to launching as a console exclusive in 2023, became a significantly focused game in Xbox's advertising of the consoles in addition to replacing prior tentpole exclusive Halo Infinite (2021) as the key visual game featured on the packaging of Xbox Series X.
- Ratchet & Clank: Rift Apart was seen as a killer app for the PlayStation 5 due to being a game released at a point in the console's lifecycle where much of the first-party software from Sony was also supplemented by a simultaneous release on PlayStation 4, in addition to being highlighted for its graphical fidelity and use of the console's various hardware features such as faster loading and the functions of the DualSense controller.
- Mario Kart World and Donkey Kong Bananza are seen as and were positioned by Nintendo as killer apps for the launch window of Nintendo Switch 2, both for their technical improvements over previous entries in their respective series, and for gameplay innovations such as World's open "Free Roam" mode and Bananza's destructible sandbox environments that leverage the increase in hardware potency.
- Pokémon games are killer apps for Nintendo handhelds, often topping the best-selling charts for whatever system they appear on.

== See also ==
- Disruptive innovation
- Unique selling point
- Vendor lock-in
- Use case
