= ComputerLand =

American computer retailer

- Formerly: Computer Shack (1976–77)
- Type: Computer store
- Industry: Retail
- Founded: 1976; 50 years ago in Hayward, California
- Founder: William H. Millard
- Defunct: 1999
- Fate: Dissolved
- Headquarters: Hayward, California, United States

ComputerLand was a widespread chain of retail computer stores during the early years of the microcomputer revolution, and was one of the outlets (along with Computer City and Sears) chosen to introduce the IBM PC in 1981. The first ComputerLand opened in 1976, and the chain eventually included about 800 stores by 1985. After this time the rapid commoditization of the PC led to the company's downfall, with most of the retail locations closing by 1990. The company officially ended in February 1999.

== History ==
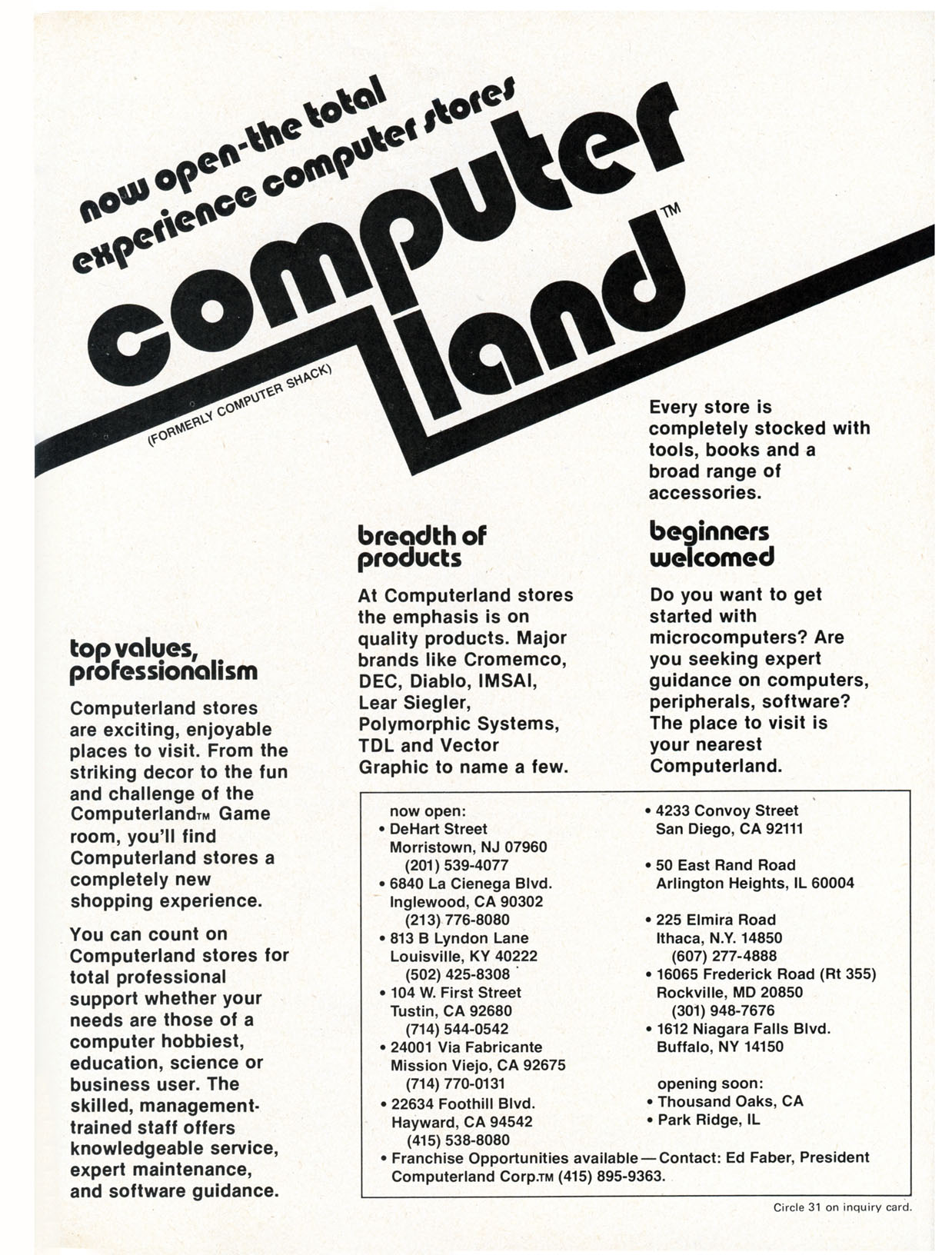
The name changed from Computer Shack to ComputerLand in this July 1977 advertisement.

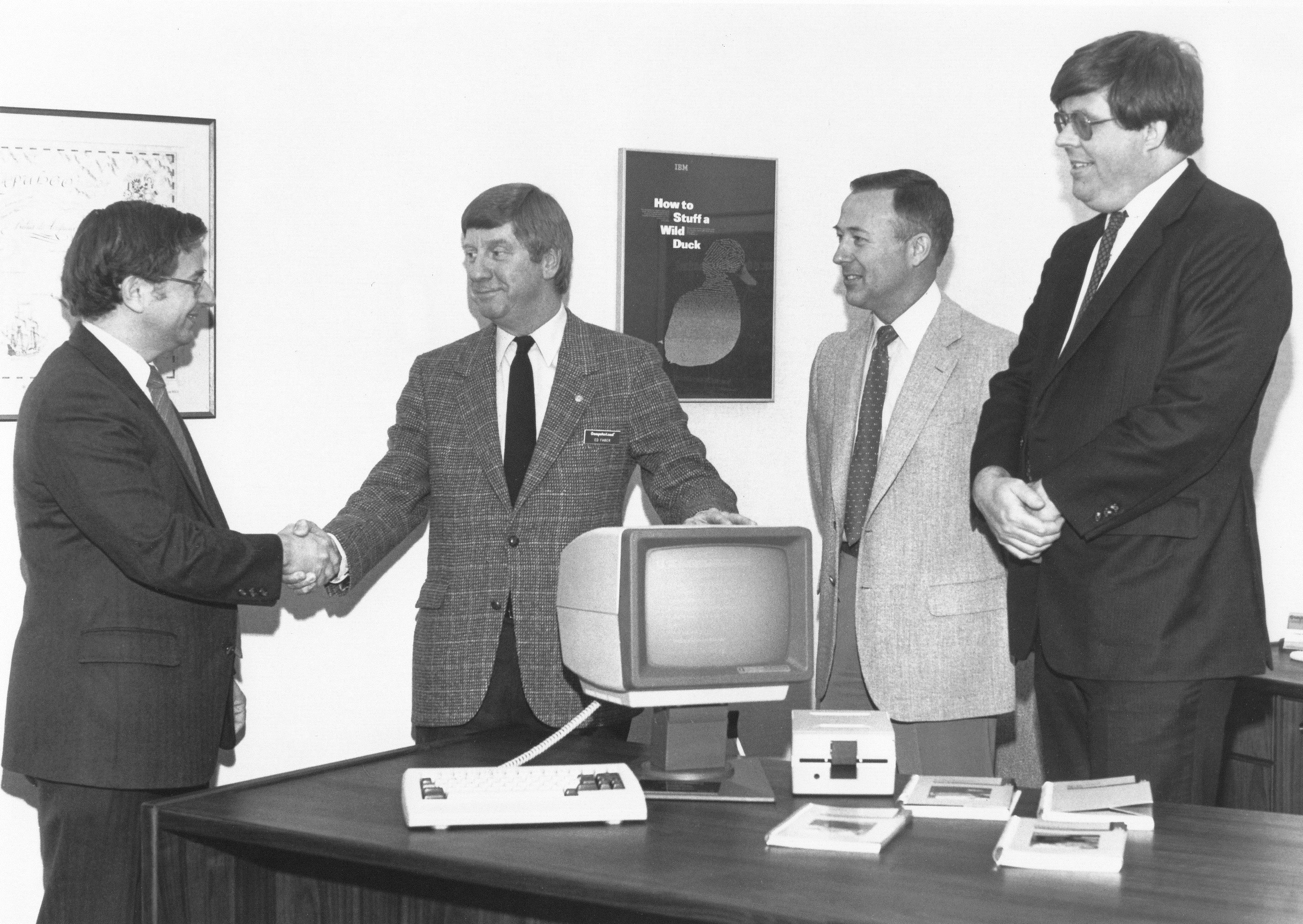
ComputerLand founder, William H. Millard, looks on as ComputerLand's Cromemco distribution agreement is finalized in 1984 (L to R: Cromemco President Harry Garland, ComputerLand President Ed Faber, ComputerLand Chairman William H. Millard, Cromemco Vice President and co-founder Roger Melen)

ComputerLand was founded by William H. Millard. In 1974 he launched a company, IMS Associates, Inc., to build what was claimed to be the first truly integrated personal computers, sold as kits to hobbyists and the rapidly growing numbers of retailers (through small ads in Popular Electronics). The computer, the IMSAI 8080, may not have made Millard's fortune, but his resulting experiences with the inexperienced and under‑capitalized retailers did. In 1976 (at the same time as the Byte Shop was selling its first few Apple II computers) he asked his Sales Director, Ed Faber (an ex‑IBM Manager), to start a new franchise operation, soon to become ComputerLand.

Faber first designed a pilot store, at Hayward, California, with the then-revolutionary concept of providing a "full service" store, offering under one roof all that the customer needed to support their PCs. The original name, Computer Shack, changed after opposition from Radio Shack. The renamed ComputerLand began franchising. The first franchisee was in Morristown, New Jersey, and was rapidly followed by a chain across the US.

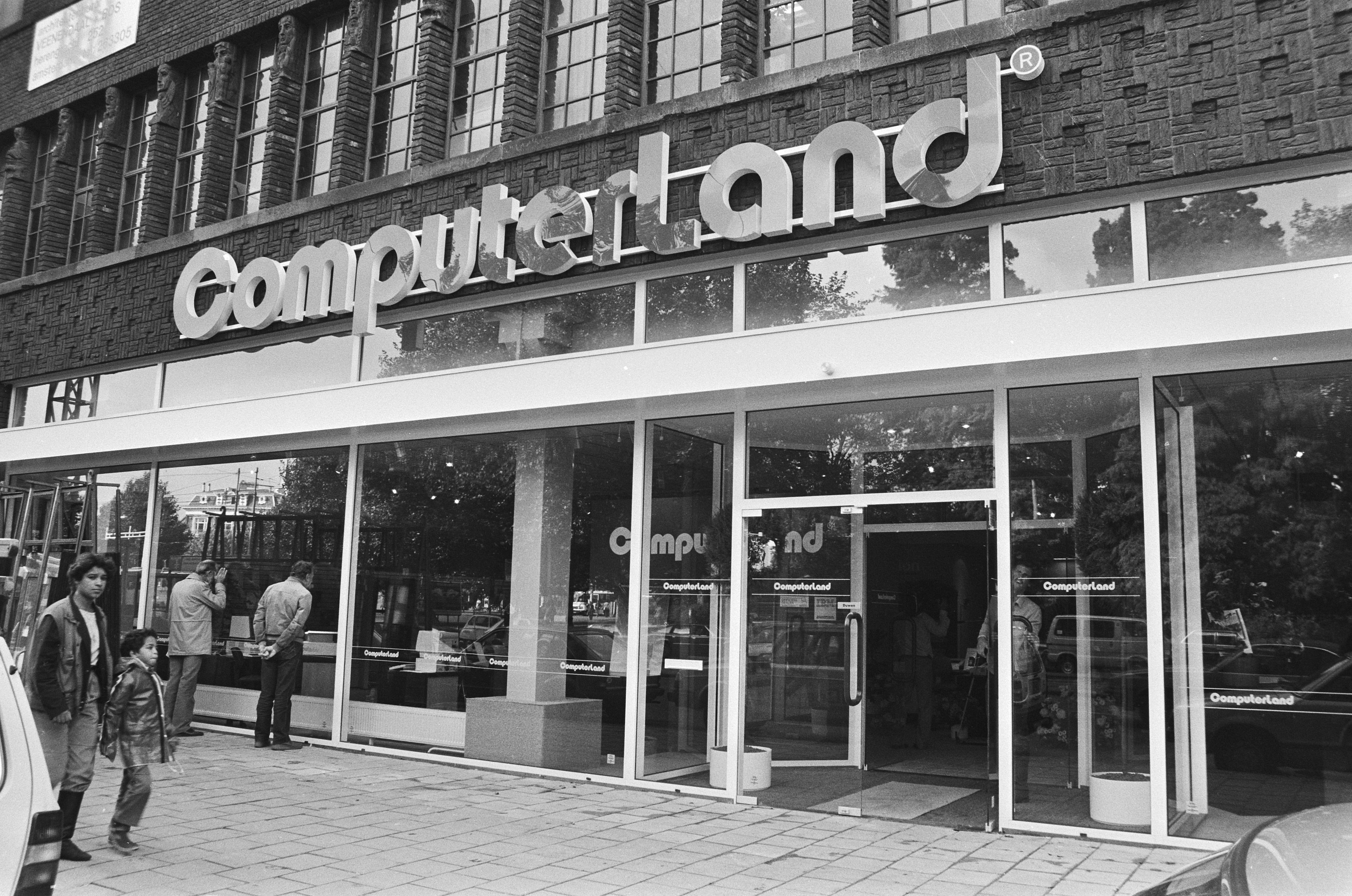
ComputerLand storefront in Amsterdam-West, 1984

Each store paid a 8% franchise fee and purchased 85-90% of its products from ComputerLand, which sold products at cost to the stores. The company kept small inventories of products, focusing on sales and marketing as opposed to product selection or training. Individual stores also purchased inventory themselves, outside ComputerLand. It set a pattern that dominated PC retailing for the next decade. By the time IBM arrived on the scene, the network of branches, all run by franchisees, had grown to 190 in number. By the end of 1985, when Millard retired, there were some 800 branches (including some 200 outside the US) and he had become one of the computer billionaires.

Most ComputerLand stores succumbed to the predation of the "box-shifters" in the price wars of the latter 1980s, after the peak had passed. In 1987, Millard sold ComputerLand to E.M. Warburg, Pincus & Co. for US$200 million.

In 1993, Merisel, a competitor company, announced it would purchase the ComputerLand name and all franchise holdings and its Datago aggregation division for $110 million. The new Merisel ComputerLand unit was operated by the then-president of Computerland's franchise and distribution business, Martin Wolf. The following year, "Vanstar" was selected as the name for the ComputerLand corporate company-owned stores stemming from the Nynex acquisition. (Pleasanton, California) after the sale of split-off franchisor to Merisel.

In 1997 Synnex Information Technologies, a national distributor of microcomputers and communication, networking, peripheral and storage products, purchased substantially all the assets of Merisel FAB Inc., including the ComputerLand franchise. Synnex created ComputerLand Corporation, a wholly owned subsidiary of Synnex, consisting of the ComputerLand and Datago businesses.

On October 9, 1998, Inacom purchased Vanstar for a reported $465 – $480 million. The resulting company employed nearly 12,000 and was estimated to generate $7 billion in revenue. The acquisition of Vanstar reportedly added a large amount of debt, and it has been said that Inacom overpaid for a company of that size. Vanstar had 43.26 million shares outstanding at the time the deal was struck, and shareholders of Vanstar received .64 shares of ICO for each VST share in a stock swap deal, thus the issuance of 27.7 M shares of stock effectively more than doubled the number of outstanding shares while also being dilutive to the existing shares. This, plus debt concerns, led to a decline in the price of Inacom's stock.

Inacom Corporation ceased operations completely in 2000. Although the corporate ComputerLand ceased operations [VanStar], many former franchises continue to operate today as independently owned computer businesses under the ComputerLand name.
