= IMDOS =

- Developer: Digital Research / IMS Associates, Inc.
- OS family: CP/M
- Working state: Historical
- Source model: Closed source
- Available in: English
- Platforms: Intel 8080
- License: Proprietary

IMDOS was a modified version of the CP/M operating system for Intel 8080 processors, used by IMS Associates, Inc. (IMS) for their IMSAI 8080 personal computer. Since MITS would not license their operating system to other manufacturers, IMS approached Gary Kildall and paid a fixed fee of $25,000 for a non-exclusive CP/M license.

IMDOS introduced interrupt-driven devices, tree-structured directories, and other advances to CP/M.
