= MicroPro International =

American software company (1978–1993)

MicroPro International Corporation
- Logo used from 1983 until 1989
- Company type: Public
- Industry: Software
- Founded: 1978; 48 years ago, San Rafael, California, United States
- Founder: Seymour I. Rubinstein
- Defunct: 1993; 33 years ago
- Fate: Acquired by SoftKey
- Products: WordStar

MicroPro International Corporation was an American software company founded in 1978 in San Rafael, California. They are best known as the publisher of WordStar, a popular early word processor for personal computers.

== History ==
=== Founding and early success ===
Original wordmark, used from 1979 to 1983

Seymour I. Rubinstein was an employee of early microcomputer company IMSAI, where he negotiated software contracts with Digital Research and Microsoft. After leaving IMSAI, Rubinstein planned to start his own software company that would sell through the new network of retail computer stores. He founded MicroPro International Corporation in September 1978 and hired John Robbins Barnaby as programmer, who wrote a word processor, WordMaster, and a sorting program, SuperSort, in Intel 8080 assembly language. After Rubinstein obtained a report that discussed the abilities of contemporary standalone word processors from IBM, Xerox, and Wang Laboratories, Barnaby enhanced WordMaster with similar features and support for the CP/M operating system. MicroPro began selling the product, now renamed WordStar, in June 1979. By early 1980, MicroPro claimed in advertisements that 5,000 people had purchased WordStar in eight months.

=== Further growth and IPO ===
An exhausted Barnaby left the company in March 1980, but due to WordStar's sophistication, the company's extensive sales and marketing efforts, and bundling deals with Osborne and other computer makers, MicroPro's sales grew from $500,000 in 1979 to $72 million in fiscal year 1984, surpassing earlier market leader Electric Pencil. By May 1983 BYTE magazine called WordStar "without a doubt the best-known and probably the most widely used personal computer word-processing program". The company released WordStar 3.3 in June 1983; the 650,000 cumulative copies of WordStar for the IBM PC and other computers sold by that fall was more than double that of the second most-popular word processor, and that year MicroPro had 10% of the personal computer software market. After recovering from overexpansion that caused a loss in late 1982 and reduced its workforce by almost half, by its 1984 initial public offering MicroPro was the world's largest microcomputer software company, with 23% of the word processor market. The company contracted with the Kaypro Corporation to have its WordStar, MailMerge, CalcStar, DataStar, and SuperSort applications included with all of Kaypro's bundled computer packages in April 1984. As of February 1983 more than half of units sold were through OEMs bundling or distributing MicroPro products, with most of the rest from distributors. The Osborne relationship was the largest, with MicroPro receiving volume-based royalties and an equity stake in Osborne. OEM revenue per unit was smaller than through other channels; by 1983 MicroPro deemphasized volume, losing some OEM deals to competitors.

Rubinstein resigned as chief executive officer in August 1983. He was replaced by E. Glen Haney, previously the vice president of strategic planning at Sperry Corporation, under which he had spearheaded Sperry Link—an office productivity software suite of Sperry's own—which Haney said afforded him experience in the microcomputer market. Rubinstein remained on the board of directors.

=== NewStar ===
WordStar became popular in large companies without MicroPro; the company did not have a corporate sales program until December 1983. By 1982 many competitors announced rival word processors, while MicroPro developed a poor reputation among customers. PC Magazine wrote in 1983 that its "motto often seems to be: 'Ask Your Dealer'". Edward Mendelson in 1985 in The Yale Review described the company's attitude as "the classic example of how not to provide" customer support, "always first with the worst".

By early 1985 MicroPro's sales had decreased for four quarters while those of Multimate and Samna increased. The latter companies focused on corporate sales, while MicroPro still did not have a direct sales force, and its retail sales also decreased. Several former MicroPro employees formed NewStar and in September 1983 published WordStar clone NewWord. MicroPro did not release new versions of WordStar beyond 3.3 during 1984 and 1985, in part because Rubinstein relinquished control of the company after a January 1984 heart attack. His replacements canceled the promising office suite Starburst, purchased a WordStar clone, and used it as the basis of WordStar 2000, released in December 1984. It received poor reviews due to not being compatible with WordStar files and other disadvantages, and by selling at the same $495 price as WordStar 3.3 confused customers. Company employees were divided between WordStar and WordStar 2000 factions, and fiscal year 1985 sales declined to $40 million.

New management purchased NewWord and used it as the basis of WordStar 4.0 in 1987, four years after the previous version. Microsoft Word (four versions from 1983 to 1987) and WordPerfect (five versions), however, had become the market leaders. More conflict between MicroPro's two factions delayed WordStar 5.0 until late 1988, again hurting the program's sales. After renaming itself after its flagship product in 1989, WordStar International merged with SoftKey in 1993.

== Products ==
=== WordStar and add-ons ===
WordStar was the first microcomputer word processor to offer mail merge and textual WYSIWYG. Besides word-wrapping (still a notable feature for early microcomputer programs), this last was most noticeably implemented as on-screen pagination during the editing session. Using the number of lines-per-page given by the user during program installation, Wordstar would display a full line of dash characters onscreen showing where page breaks would occur during hardcopy printout. Many users found this very reassuring during editing, knowing beforehand where pages would end and begin, and where text would thus be interrupted across pages.

==== SpellStar ====
SpellStar was an add-on program to WordStar that allowed the user to check words for misspellings against either a dictionary of 20,000 English words, a user-defined dictionary, or a third-party dictionary list for other languages besides English. SpellStar marked words flagged as misspelled in real time within WordStar and allowed the user to review words that it flagged as misspelled but for which it could not find a close replacement. Specialist vocabulary such as jargon or proper nouns could be added to any dictionary; users could disable words within the dictionary as well, to prevent the false-flagging of certain words.

==== MailMerge ====
MailMerge was another add-on program to WordStar (becoming integrated from WordStar 4 onwards) which facilitated the merge printing of bulk mailings, such as business letters to clients. Two files were required:

1. a data file, being a list of recipients stored in a non-document, comma-delimited plain ASCII text file, typically named Clients.dat (although WordStar had no requirement for a specific file extension). Each subsequent line of text in the file would be dedicated to a particular client, with name and address details separated on the line dedicated to a client by commas, read left to right. For example: Mr., Michael, Smith, 7 Oakland Drive, ... WordStar would also access Lotus123 spreadsheet files (*.wk1) for this data and if the data contained flags to start and stop WordStar processing the data then flags could be set so that certain 'clients' are omitted from the output stream.
2. a master document containing the text of the letter, using standard paragraphs (a.k.a. boilerplate text) as required. These would be mixed and matched as needed, and where appropriate, paragraphs could be inserted through external reference to subordinate documents.

The writer would insert placeholders delimited by ampersands into the master document, e.g., &TITLE&, &INITIAL&, &SURNAME&, &ADDRESS1&. In each copy of the letter the placeholders would be replaced with strings read from the DAT file. Mass mailings could thereby be prepared with each letter copy individually addressed.

==== StarIndex ====
StarIndex was an indexing and chapter management program that allowed WordStar users to demarcate chapter title headings and sectional subheadings to automatically generate a table of contents (also allowing to the user to adjust the degree of the subheadings the table of contents lists). StarIndex also allowed the user to automate the creation of indices by flagging words in the body pages and taking note of the page number. The software allowed the words, page numbers, and page number prefixes to be formatted independently. StarIndex also facilitated the creation of hierarchical outlines, appendices, and lists of figures.

=== CalcStar ===
CalcStar was an entry-level spreadsheet application, introduced for CP/M in November 1981 and MS-DOS in April 1983. A direct competitor to VisiCalc, MicroPro programmed CalcStar's shortcut keys to closely follow WordStar's and allowed for direct formatting of text within cells, including boldface and underlining. CalcStar was oriented toward novice users, based around a menu-driven interface that provided many prompts to guide the user through the software.

=== PlanStar ===
Introduced in 1982, PlanStar was another spreadsheet application, oriented toward financial planners. PlanStar prioritized the presentation of data over number-crunching, allowing users to define such through an instruction list of name–value pairs that define the headers of rows and columns, what to calculate, and how the data is to be formatted. It also supported rudimentary creation of graphic reports, such as pies and line charts. Up to 9,999 stored instructions were supported, to manipulate an array of 999 "worksheets" (spreadsheets). Entire worksheets could be fed into functions, for example, "to consolidate four income statement worksheets for a company's four regions".

Functions included:

- amortization;
- cumulative totaling;
- forecasting;
- inflated value checking;
- calculation of the internal rate of return;
- linear regression;
- line fitting;
- maxima and minima;
- mortgaging;
- moving average;
- calculation of net present value;
- percentage;
- rounding;
- salvage value;
- summation;
- and value discounting.

Additionally data could be piped into a BASIC program using the CHAIN function.

=== InfoStar ===
InfoStar was a database manager introduced in early 1982. Originally only a report generator, the software was later expanded as a full database application suite comprising DataStar and ReportStar.

==== DataStar ====
Introduced in 1980 and later integrated into InfoStar, DataStar consisted of a form creation wizard and data entry application (FormGen) and a database retrieval and updating utility (DataStar).

==== ReportStar ====
Introduced in 1983 as part of the revised InfoStar, ReportStar generated textual reports from the data generated by DataStar.

=== StarBurst ===
Introduced in 1984, StarBurst was a menu-based shell that attempted to integrate the full line of MicroPro applications. MicroPro sold the application separately, as well as bundling it with InfoStar as part of the InfoStar+ package. It was the first-ever office suite of personal computer programs.
