= WordStar =

Word processor application

- WordStar running under MS-DOS
- Original author: Rob Barnaby
- Developer: MicroPro International Corporation
- Release: 1978; 48 years ago
- Stable release: WordStar 7.0d / 1999; 27 years ago
- Operating system: CP/M-80 (originally on Intel 8080 and Zilog Z80); MS-DOS, Windows
- Type: Word processor
- Website: www.wordstar.org

WordStar is a discontinued word processor application for microcomputers. It was published by MicroPro International and originally written for the CP/M-80 operating system (OS), with later editions added for MS-DOS and other 16-bit PC operating systems. Rob Barnaby was the sole author of the early versions of the program.

Starting with WordStar 4.0, the program was built on new code written principally by Peter Mierau. WordStar dominated the market in the early and mid-1980s, succeeding the previous market leader, Electric Pencil.

WordStar was written with as few assumptions as possible about the operating system and machine hardware, allowing it to be easily ported across the many platforms that proliferated in the early 1980s. Because all of these versions had relatively similar commands and controls, users could move between platforms with equal ease. It was already popular when its inclusion with the Osborne 1 portable computer made the program the de facto standard for much of the small computer word-processing market.

As the market became dominated by the IBM PC and later Microsoft Windows, this same portable design made it difficult for the program to add new features and affected its performance. In spite of its great popularity in the early 1980s, these problems allowed WordPerfect to take WordStar's place as the most widely used word processor from 1985 on.

WordStar was last updated in December 1992.

== History ==
=== Founding ===
Seymour I. Rubinstein was an employee of early microcomputer company IMSAI, where he negotiated software contracts with Digital Research and Microsoft. After leaving IMSAI, Rubinstein planned to start his own software company that would sell through the new network of retail computer stores. He founded MicroPro International Corporation in September 1978 and hired John Robbins Barnaby as programmer, who wrote a word processor, WordMaster, and a sorting program, SuperSort, in Intel 8080 assembly language. After Rubinstein obtained a report that discussed the abilities of contemporary standalone word processors from IBM, Xerox, and Wang Laboratories, Barnaby enhanced WordMaster with similar features and support for the CP/M operating system. MicroPro began selling the product, now renamed WordStar, in June 1979. Priced at $495 and $40 for the manual, by early 1980, MicroPro said in advertisements that 5,000 people had purchased WordStar in eight months.

=== Early success ===
WordStar was the first microcomputer word processor to offer mail merge and textual WYSIWYG. Besides word-wrapping (still a notable feature for early microcomputer programs), this last was most noticeably implemented as on-screen pagination during the editing session. Using the number of lines-per-page given by the user during program installation, WordStar would display a full line of dash characters onscreen showing where page breaks would occur during hardcopy printout. Many users found this very reassuring during editing, knowing beforehand where pages would end and begin, and where text would thus be interrupted across pages.

Barnaby left the company in March 1980, but due to WordStar's sophistication, the company's extensive sales and marketing efforts, and bundling deals with Osborne and other computer makers, MicroPro's sales grew from $500,000 in 1979 to $72 million in fiscal year 1984, surpassing earlier market leader Electric Pencil. By May 1983 BYTE magazine called WordStar "without a doubt the best-known and probably the most widely used personal computer word-processing program". The company released WordStar 3.3 in June 1983; the 650,000 cumulative copies of WordStar for the IBM PC and other computers sold by that fall was more than double that of the second most-popular word processor, and that year MicroPro had 10% of the personal computer software market. By 1984, the year it held an initial public offering, MicroPro was the world's largest software company with 23% of the word processor market.

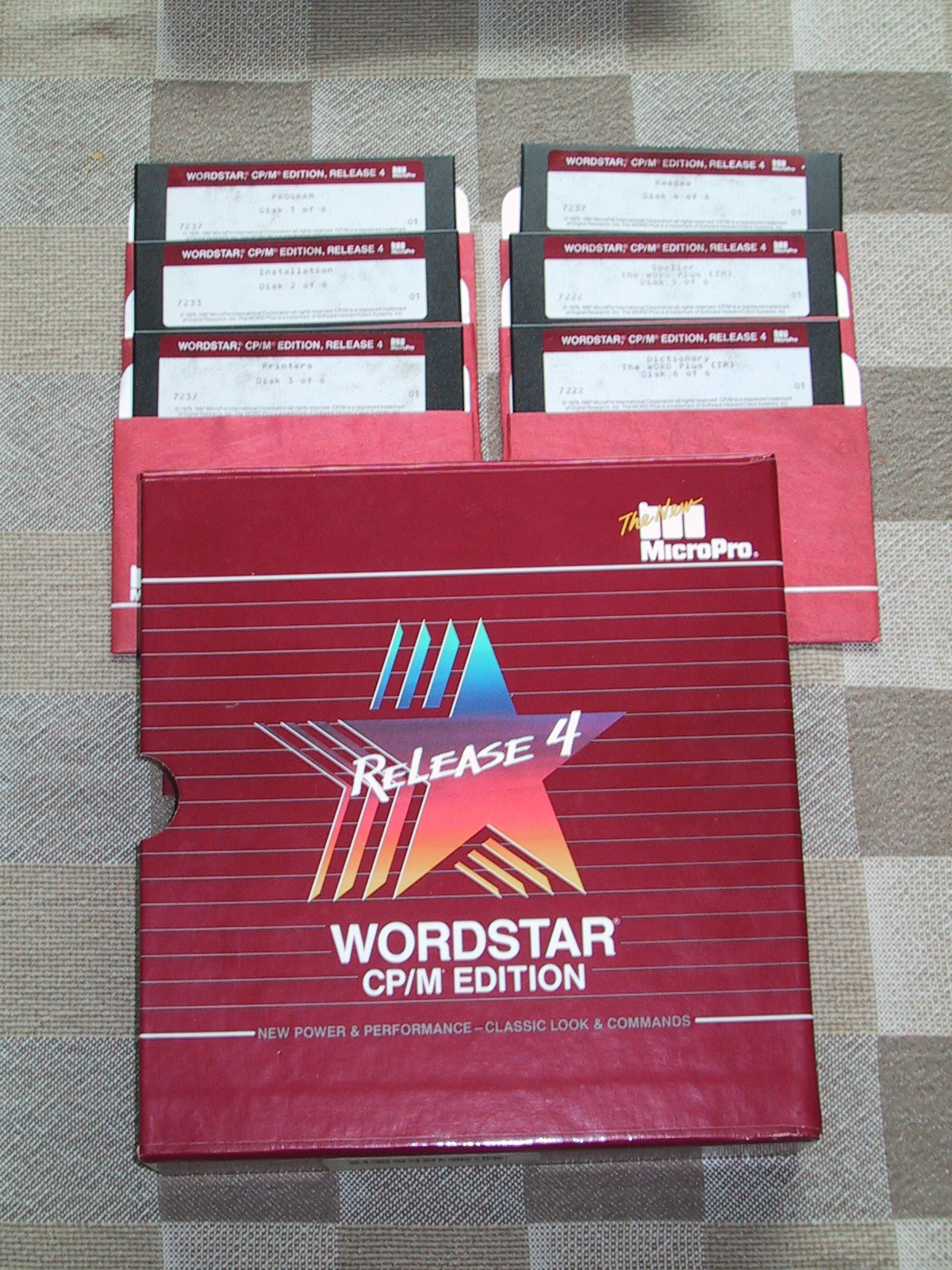
Distribution 5 1/4-inch (130 mm) diskettes and packaging for the last version (Version 4) of WordStar released for 8-bit CP/M

A manual that PC Magazine described as "incredibly inadequate" and "a looseleaf nightmare" led many authors to publish replacements. One of them, Introduction to WordStar, was written by future Goldstein & Blair founder and Whole Earth Software Catalog contributor Arthur Naiman, who hated the program and had a clause inserted into his publishing contract that he not be required to use WordStar to write the book, using WRITE instead.

=== MS-DOS ===
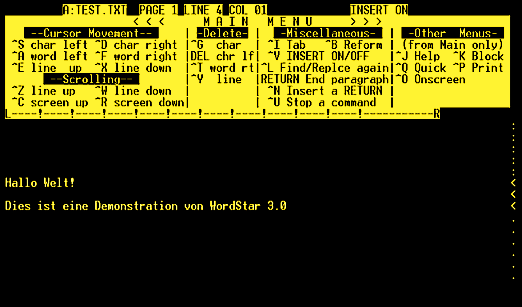
WordStar 3 under CP/M

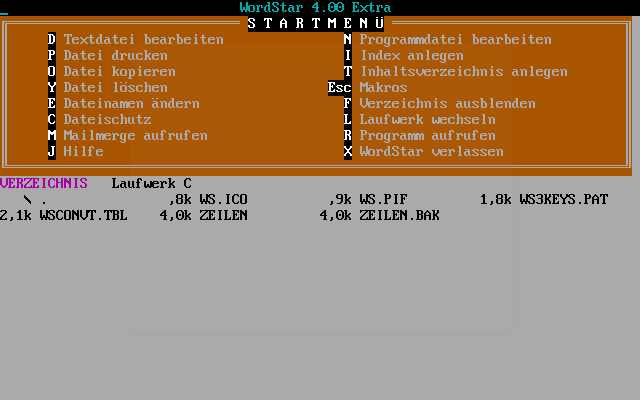
Screenshot of WordStar 4

WordStar 7 under Windows XP

WordStar 3.0, the first version for MS-DOS, appeared in April 1982. Until then, many PC owners bought Z-80 cards so they could run the CP/M version. The first DOS version is very similar to the CP/M original, and although the IBM PC has arrow keys and separate function keys, the traditional "WordStar diamond" and other Ctrl-key functions were retained, leading to rapid adoption by former CP/M users. WordStar's ability to use a "non-document" mode to create text files without formatting made it popular among programmers as a source-code editor. Like the CP/M versions, the DOS WordStar was not explicitly designed for IBM PCs, but rather for any x86 machine (as there were a number of non-IBM-compatible PCs that used 8086 or 80186 CPUs). As such, it uses only DOS's API calls and avoids any BIOS usage or direct hardware access. This carried with it a performance penalty as everything had to be "double" processed (meaning that the DOS API functions would handle screen or keyboard I/O first and then pass them to the BIOS).

The first DOS version of WordStar, demonstrated by Jim Fox and executed by a team of Irish programmers in April 1982, was a port of the CP/M-86 version of WordStar, which in turn had been ported from the CP/M-80 version in September 1981. This had been started by Diane Hajicek and was completed by an Irish team of programmers under ISIS-II, probably using Intel's source-to-source translator CONV86. Thus the main program executable was a .COM file which could only access 64 kB of memory. Users quickly learned they could make WordStar run dramatically faster by installing a RAM disk board, and copying the WordStar program files into it. WordStar would still access the "disk" repeatedly, but the far faster access of the RAM drive compared to a floppy disk yielded a substantial speed improvement. However, edited versions of a document were "saved" only to this RAM disk, and had to be copied to physical media before rebooting.

InfoWorld described WordStar as "notorious for its complexity", and Stephen Manes of PC wrote that its "function keys seemed to have been assigned late one drunken Saturday night", but by 1983 WordStar was the leading word processing system ("the disks moved off the shelves faster than Charlie Chaplin’s pies", Manes said). Although competition appeared early (the first version of WordPerfect debuted in 1982 and Microsoft Word in 1983), WordStar was the dominant word processor on x86 machines until 1985. It was part of the software bundle that accompanied Kaypro computers.

At that time, the evolution from CP/M to MS-DOS, with an Alt key, had taken place. WordStar had until then never successfully exploited the MS-DOS keyboard, and that is one explanation for its demise.

By that point, MicroPro had dropped the generic MS-DOS support and WordStar 4.0 was exclusively for IBM compatibles, which differed from MS-DOS-compatible programs in terms of screen addressing. It was the first version of WordStar supporting directories—a feature nearly mandatory to be usable on machines with hard disks. Also introduced were simple macros (shorthand) and the install program was completely updated to include features like reprogramming function keys and an extensive printer support. During the second half of the 1980s, the fully modernized WordPerfect overtook it in sales.

WordStar 5 (released in 1989) added footnote and endnote capability and a fairly advanced Page preview function. Versions 5.5 and 6 had added features, and version 7 (released 1991) included a complete macro language as well as support for over 500 printers. It also featured style sheets and mouse support.

=== Problems with piracy ===
WordStar was not copy-protected up to and including version 3.3. Columnist John Dvorak recalled:

WordStar may have been the most pirated software in the world, which in many ways accounted for its success. (Software companies don’t like to admit to this as a possibility.) Books for WordStar sold like hot cakes and the authors knew they were selling documentation for pirated copies of WordStar. The company itself should have just sold the documentation alone to increase sales. This was the wink-wink-nudge-nudge aspect of the industry at the time and everyone knew it. So when WordStar 2000 arrived with a copy protection scheme, everyone should have predicted its immediate demise.

Besides the ready availability of third-party books explaining WordStar in detail, the program's extensive and configurable onscreen help facility (help text appeared in a resizable window at the top of the screen) made it easy to use an illegal copy.

=== WordStar 2000 ===
At the time, the IBM Displaywriter System dominated the dedicated word processor market. IBM's main competition was Wang Laboratories. Such machines were expensive and were generally accessed through terminals connected to central mainframe or midrange computers.

When IBM announced it was bringing DisplayWrite to the PC, MicroPro focused on creating a clone of it which they marketed, in 1984, as WordStar 2000. WordStar 2000 supported features such as disk directories, but lacked compatibility with the file formats of existing WordStar versions and also made numerous unpopular changes to the interface. Gradually competitors such as WordPerfect reduced MicroPro's market share. MultiMate, in particular, used the same key sequences as Wang word processors, which made it popular with secretaries switching from those to PCs.

BYTE magazine stated that WordStar 2000 had "all the charm of an elephant on motorized skates", warning in 1986 that an IBM PC AT with hard drive was highly advisable to run the software, which it described as "clumsy, overdesigned, and uninviting ... I can't come up with a reason why I'd want to use it". WordStar 2000 had a user interface that was substantially different from the original WordStar, and the company did little to advertise this. However, its lasting legacy on the word processing industry was the introduction of three keyboard shortcuts that are still widely used, namely, Ctrl+B for boldfacing, Ctrl+I for italicizing, and Ctrl+U for underlining text.

=== NewStar ===
WordStar became popular in large companies without MicroPro. The company, which did not have a corporate sales program until December 1983, developed an arrogant reputation among customers. After PC DOS 1.1 was incompatible with WordStar 3.02 MicroPro did not update its software for months, then did not notify customers who had mailed in registration cards of its existence or later updates. 3.3, released in 1983, had many improvements and much better documentation but still did not use more than 64K RAM at once. PC Magazine wrote that year that the company's "motto often seems to be: 'Ask Your Dealer'", and in 1985 that

Almost since its birth 4 years ago, MicroPro has had a seemingly unshakable reputation for three things: arrogant indifference to user feedback ("MicroPro's classic response to questions about WordStar was, "Call your dealer"); possession of one of the more difficult-to-use word processors on the market; and possession of the most powerful word processor available.

By late 1984, the company admitted, according to the magazine, that WordStar's reputation for power was fading, and by early 1985, its sales had decreased for four quarters while those of Multimate and Samna increased. At some point WordStar's source code was reportedly lost and reconstructed by Peter Mierau. After being laid off by the company in October 1982, he and other former MicroPro employees formed rival company NewStar. In September 1983, it published WordStar clone NewWord, which offered several features the original lacked, such as a built-in spell checker and support for laser printers. Advertisements stated that "Anyone with WordStar experience won't even have to read NewWord's manuals. WordStar text files work with NewWord". Despite competition from NewStar, Microsoft Word, WordPerfect, and dozens of other companies, which typically released new versions of their software every 12 to 18 months, MicroPro did not release new versions of WordStar beyond 3.3 during 1984 and 1985, in part because Rubinstein relinquished control of the company after a January 1984 heart attack. His replacements canceled the promising office suite Starburst, purchased a WordStar clone, and used it as the basis of WordStar 2000, released in December 1984. It received poor reviews—by April 1985 PC Magazine referred to WordStar 2000 as "beleaguered"—due to not being compatible with WordStar files and other disadvantages, and by selling at the same $495 price as WordStar 3.3 confused customers. Company employees were divided between WordStar and WordStar 2000 factions, and fiscal year 1985 sales declined to $40 million.

Jerry Pournelle wrote in September 1984 that NewWord was file and command compatible with WordStar 3.3, with comparable speed, more features, and better built-in help. He quoted another user as describing it as "WordStar without glitches". By that year, NewWord had released a second version, and many WordStar users switched to it. A third version appeared in 1986; The New York Times wrote that NewWord 3 "provides the perfect excuse for WordStar users to switch software, as if WordStar users needed an excuse".

In February 1985 MicroPro promised updates to WordStar 3.3, but the company's attempt to improve Mierau's reconstructed source code reportedly resulted in an unusable product. No update appeared until new management purchased NewWord and used it as the basis of WordStar 4.0 in 1987, four years after the previous version. Word (four versions from 1983 to 1987) and WordPerfect (five versions), however, had become the market leaders. More conflict between MicroPro's two factions delayed WordStar 5.0 until late 1988, again hurting the program's sales. After renaming itself after its flagship product in 1989, WordStar International merged with SoftKey in 1993.

=== WordStar for Windows ===
Like many other producers of successful DOS applications, WordStar International delayed before deciding to make a version for the commercially successful Windows 3.0. The company purchased Legacy, an existing Windows-based word processor, which was altered and released as WordStar for Windows in 1991. It was a well-reviewed product and included many features normally only found in more expensive desktop publishing packages. However, its delayed launch meant that Microsoft Word had already firmly established itself as the corporate standard during the two previous years.

== Notable users ==
WordStar was the program of choice for conservative intellectual William F. Buckley, Jr., who used the software to write many works, including his last book. His son Christopher Buckley wrote of his father's loyalty to WordStar, despite the increasing difficulty of installing it on newer computers. The elder Buckley said of WordStar, "I'm told there are better programs, but I'm also told there are better alphabets".

Ralph Ellison also used WordStar.

Robert J. Sawyer, a Canadian science-fiction writer, continues to use WordStar 7.0 for DOS (the final release, last updated in 1992) to write his novels, All twenty-five of his novels were written with WordStar. As the app is now "abandonware", and there was no proper archive of WordStar 7.0 for DOS available online, he decided to create one. He put together as complete a version of WordStar 7 as might exist. He bundled together over 1,000 pages of scanned manuals that came with WordStar, related utilities, his own README guidance, ready-to-run versions of DOSBox-X and VDosPlus, and WordStar 7 Rev. D and posted them on his website as the "Complete WordStar 7.0 Archive".

As of 2020, fantasy author George R. R. Martin used the MS-DOS version of WordStar 4.0.

Andy Breckman, the creator of Monk, is a devoted WordStar user.

Novelist Anne Rice was another faithful user of WordStar who struggled to have it installed on newer computers until it could no longer reasonably be done. She then grudgingly transitioned to Microsoft Word, whose design she felt was comparatively unintuitive and illogical. Rice noted "WordStar was magnificent. I loved it. It was logical, beautiful, perfect," adding, "Compared to it, MS Word which I use today is pure madness."

== Reception ==
InfoWorld in 1984 approved of WordStar 3.3 for the IBM PC's improved documentation. The magazine concluded that although "it doesn't have all the fancy features of some of the newer word-processing programs ... it has virtually everything you might need ... The program performs well in almost any word-processing situation".

Edward Mendelson in summer 1985 preferred WordPerfect and others to the "chaotic and incapable" WordStar, stating in The Yale Review that users "are doomed to spend months memorizing wildly illogical commands like Contrl-OG, which, in an insane demonstration of the arbitrariness of language, means 'indent this paragraph.'" He added that "On balance, [WordStar 2000] offers no improvement over the original".

A 1988 PC Magazine reader survey found that 19% used WordStar. While second after WordPerfect and ahead of Word, 39% of those who had changed word processors previously used WordStar, compared to 10% for MultiMate and 5% for WordPerfect or Word. A 1990 American Institute of Certified Public Accountants member survey found that 13% used WordStar. While second only to WordPerfect (46%) and ahead of Word (8%) among word processors, 10% of users said they would not recommend WordStar, compared to 1% for WordPerfect and 2% for Word.

== Version list ==
This is a list of the various WordStar versions released over the years for different machines.

- WordStar 1.0 for CP/M (1978)
- WordStar 2.0 for CP/M (1978)
- WordStar for TRS-80 LDOS (1979)
- WordStar for Epson Personal Computer (1980)
- WordStar for Osborne 1 Portable Computer (1981)
- WordStar 3.0 for CP/M and MS-DOS (1982)
- WordStar 3.3 for CP/M and MS-DOS (1983)
- WordStar for PCjr (1984)
- WordStar 2000 for MS-DOS (1985)
- WordStar 2000 for AT&T UNIX (1985)
- WordStar Express for MS-DOS (1986)
- WordStar 2000 Release 2 for MS-DOS (1986)
- WordStar 2000 Plus Release 3.5 for MS-DOS (1987)
- WordStar 4 for CP/M and MS-DOS (1987)
- WordStar 5 for MS-DOS (1988)
- WordStar 6 for MS-DOS (1990)
- WordStar for Windows 1.0 (1991)
- WordStar for Windows 1.1 (1991)
- WordStar 7 for MS-DOS (1992)
- WordStar for Windows 1.5 (1992)
- WordStar for Windows 2.0 (1994)

== Interface ==
Prior to WordStar, word processors split text entry and formatting into separate functions; the latter was often not done until a document was about to be printed. WordStar was one of the first "what you see is what you get" word processors, showing accurate line breaks and page breaks on the computer screen. It was a major breakthrough to be able to see and modify where line breaks and page breaks would fall—even though, being a text-based program, WordStar couldn't accurately display different typefaces such as bold and italic until version 5.0.

In a default installation on a 25-line screen, the top third of the screen contained a menu of commands and a status line; the lower two-thirds of the screen displayed the text of the user's document. A user-configurable option to set the help level released this space for user text. The help system could be configured to display help a short time after the first key of a command sequence was entered. As users became more familiar with the command sequences, the help system could be set to provide less and less assistance until finally all on-screen menus and status information would be turned off.

The original computer terminals and microcomputers for which WordStar was developed, many running the CP/M operating system, did not have function keys or cursor control keys (arrow keys, ⇞ Page Up/⇟ Page Down). WordStar used sequences of alphabetic keys combined with the "⌃ Control" key, which on keyboards of the time was conveniently next to the letter A in the position now usually occupied by the ⇬ Caps Lock key. For touch typists, in addition, reaching the function and cursor keys generally requires them to take their fingers off the "home keys" with consequent loss of typing rhythm.

For example, the "diamond" of Ctrl+S(left)/Ctrl+E(up)/Ctrl+D(right)/Ctrl+X(down) moved the cursors one character or line to the left, up, right, or down. Ctrl+A/Ctrl+F (to the outside of the "diamond") moved the cursor a full word left/right, and Ctrl+R/Ctrl+C (just "past" the ⌃ Ctrl keys for up and down) scrolled a full page up/page down. Prefacing these keystrokes with Ctrl+Q generally expanded their action, moving the cursor to the end/beginning of the line, end/beginning of the document, etc. Ctrl+G would delete the character under the cursor. Ctrl+H would backspace and delete. Commands to enable bold or italics, printing, blocking text to copy or delete, saving or retrieving files from disk, etc. were typically a short sequence of keystrokes, such as Ctrl+P+B for bold, or Ctrl+K+S to save a file. Formatting codes would appear on screen, such as ^B for bold, ^Y for italics, and ^S for underscoring.

Although many of these keystroke sequences were far from self-evident, they tended to lend themselves to mnemonic devices (e.g., Ctrl-Print-Bold, Ctrl-blocK-Save), and regular users quickly learned them through muscle memory, enabling them to rapidly navigate documents by touch, rather than memorizing "Ctrl+S = cursor left."

Early versions of WordStar lacked features found in other word processors, such as the ability to automatically reformat paragraphs to fit the current margins as text was added or deleted; a command had to be issued to force reformatting. The subsequent WordStar 2000 (and later versions of WordStar for DOS) added automatic paragraph reformatting (and all versions of WordStar had commands to manually reformat a paragraph (^B) or the rest of the document (^QQ^B and, as a later synonym, ^QU)).

WordStar was rare among word processing programs in that it permitted the user to mark (highlight) a block of text (with ^KB and ^KK commands) and leave it marked in place, and then go to a different position in the document and later (even after considerable work on other things) copy the block (with ^KC) or move it to a new location (with ^KV). Many users found it much easier to manipulate blocks this way than with the Microsoft Word system of highlighting with a mouse and then being forced by Word's select-then-do approach to immediately deal with the marked block, lest any typing replace it. The subsequent WordStar 2000 retained WordStar's distinctive functionality for block manipulation. As part of the ^K sequence of shortcuts, it offered true bookmarks (^K1 to ^K9) allowing the editor to move about in large documents with ease.

Column Mode editing was probably unique to WordStar. As a basic text editor, the interface showed all characters to be the same width - hence 80 characters across an 80 column screen resolution. By switching on column mode editing a rectangle of text spanning several characters and several lines could be selected and manipulated. This was very handy for manipulating columns of numbers and non-standard files. Once selected, the feature could also be used to calculate the total of a column of numbers and place the result at the insertion point.

Formatting with WordStar was carried out before the text to be formatted—unlike many other word processors where the formatting of a paragraph is 'buried' within the usually hidden paragraph marker at the end of the paragraph. This latter method leaves the user unclear where formatting starts. In normal editing, WordStar hides formatting markers but these are easily displayed with ^OD command. Formatting information is then displayed in the normal text area displacing the actual text. It nonetheless made it absolutely clear where formatting started and finished. Page and section formatting was handled differently by the addition of formatting lines. A formatting line was indicated by the line starting with a full stop. Some third-party WordStar books called formatting lines "dot commands". A few examples: .lh (line height) .lm (left margin) .rm (right margin) - each of which was followed by a number. The number was assumed to be points (pt) but could be easily modified to inches or mm by the addition of " or mm after the number. .lm and .rm were never equal as both values were from the left hand edge of the page. Setting .rm to 0 made text lines infinitely long. Margins could also be set either absolutely or relatively (by preceding the value with either - or +) when setting the value.

If any invalid formatting commands are encountered, when printing WordStar (version 3.3 at least) will ignore the line (all text until the next carriage return terminating the line). This could confuse novice users who unintentionally began a line with a decimal point (same as period or dot character) and WordStar would not print the line. For instance, a line reading: ".05 percent text text text..." would not appear in the printout though the document would continue on the printout without any error reported.

WordStar 2000 added few new commands, but completely rewrote the user interface, using simple English-language mnemonics (so the command to remove a word, which had been ^T in WordStar, became ^RW in WordStar 2000; the command to remove the text from the rest of the line to the right of the cursor changed from ^QY to ^RR). However, many in WordStar's large installed user based were happy with the original WordStar interface, and did not consider the changes to be improvements. Although WordStar 2000 was meant as the successor to WordStar, it never gained substantial market share.

The original WordStar interface left a large legacy, and many of its control-key command are still available (optionally or as the default) in other programs, such as the modern cross-platform word processing software TextMaker and many text editors running under MS-DOS, Linux, and other UNIX variants. Some Borland products, including the popular Turbo Pascal compiler, and Borland Sidekick, used a subset of WordStar keyboard commands, the former in its IDE and the latter in the "Notepad" editors. The TEXT editor built into the firmware of the TRS-80 Model 100 portable computer supported a subset of the WordStar cursor movement commands (in addition to its own). Home word processing software like Write&Set not only use the WordStar interface, but have been based on WordStar DOS file formats, allowing WordStar users who no longer have a copy of the application to easily open and edit their files. There are WordStar keyboard command emulators and keymappings, both freeware and shareware, for current versions of Microsoft Word. Popular modern word processing software WordPerfect can open or save to WordStar documents, enabling users to move back and forth.

== Add-ons and companion products ==
MailMerge was an add-on program (becoming integrated from WordStar 4 onwards) which facilitated the merge printing of bulk mailings, such as business letters to clients. Two files were required:

1. a data file, being a list of recipients stored in a non-document, comma-delimited plain ASCII text file, typically named Clients.dat (although WordStar had no requirement for a specific file extension). Each subsequent line of text in the file would be dedicated to a particular client, with name and address details separated on the line dedicated to a client by commas, read left to right. For example: Mr., Michael, Smith, 7 Oakland Drive, ... WordStar would also access Lotus 1-2-3 spreadsheet files (*.wk1) for this data and if the data contained flags to start and stop WordStar processing the data then flags could be set so that certain 'clients' are omitted from the output stream.
2. a master document containing the text of the letter, using standard paragraphs (a.k.a. boilerplate text) as required. These would be mixed and matched as needed, and where appropriate, paragraphs could be inserted through external reference to subordinate documents.

The writer would insert placeholders delimited by ampersands into the master document, e.g., &TITLE&, &INITIAL&, &SURNAME&, &ADDRESS1&. In each copy of the letter the placeholders would be replaced with strings read from the DAT file. Mass mailings could thereby be prepared with each letter copy individually addressed.

Other add-on programs included SpellStar, a spell checker program, later incorporated as a direct part of the WordStar program; and DataStar, a program whose purpose was specifically to expedite creating of the data files used for merge printing. These were revolutionary features for personal computer users during the early-to-mid-1980s. A companion spreadsheet, CalcStar, was also produced using a somewhat WordStar-like interface; collectively, WordStar (word processing), DataStar/ReportStar (database management, a.k.a. InfoStar), and CalcStar (spreadsheet) comprised StarBurst, the first-ever office suite of personal computer programs.

As a product enhancement, in the late 1980s WordStar 5 came bundled with PC-Outline, a popular MS-DOS outliner then available from Brown Bag Software in California. PC-Outline text had to be exported to a WordStar-format file, as the programs were not developed to be internally compatible.

== Bidirectional text ==
Around 1978, Elbit Systems in Israel developed a CP/M-capable microcomputer named the DS2100. CP/M machines were readily available and Elbit needed something to differentiate their product from others. An agreement was made with MicroPro to develop a version of WordStar that supported both English and Hebrew input. The concept was revolutionary, as Hebrew is written right-to-left and all word processors of the time assumed left-to-right. WordStar, as developed by Elbit, was the first word processor that offered bidirectional input and mixed alphabets.

Elbit acquired rights to the source code and a development team in Elbit, Haifa, worked on the project. For several years Hebrew-English WordStar was the de facto WYSIWYG word processor leader until, inevitably, it was ousted by newer competitors.

== File types ==
WordStar identified files as either "document" or "nondocument," which led to some confusion among users. "Document" referred to WordStar word processing files containing embedded word processing and formatting commands. "Nondocument" files were pure ASCII text files containing no embedded formatting commands. Using WordStar in "Nondocument Mode" was essentially the same as using a traditional text editor. WordStar 5 introduced a document-mode "print preview" feature, allowing the user to inspect a WYSIWYG version of text, complete with inserted graphics, as it would appear on the printed page.

=== Filename extensions ===
- DOS WordStar files by default have no extension; some users adopted their own conventions, such as the letters WS followed by the version number (for example, WS3), or just plain WS. Backup files were automatically saved as BAKs.
- WordStar for Windows files use the extension WSD
- WordStar for Windows templates use the extension WST
- WordStar for Windows macros use the extension WMC
- WordStar for Windows temporary files use the extension !WS
- WordStar 2000 for DOS and UNIX PC do not have a fixed extension, but DOC and WS2 were common

== Installation ==
Installation of early versions of WordStar, especially for CP/M, was very different from the approach of modern programs. While later editions had more-or-less comprehensive installation programs that allowed selection of printers and terminals from a menu, in the very early releases, each of the escape sequences required for the terminal and printer had to be identified in the hardware documentation, then hand-entered (in hex) into reserved locations in the program memory image. This was a fairly typical limitation of all CP/M programs of the time, since there was no mechanism to hide the complexities of the underlying hardware from the application program. To use the program with a different printer required re-installation of the program. Occasionally short machine-language programs had to be entered in a patch area in WordStar, to provide particular screen effects or cope with particular printers. Researching, testing, and proving out such installations was a time-consuming and knowledge-intensive process, making WordStar installation and customization a staple discussion of CP/M users' groups during that time.

DOS versions of WordStar at least had standardized the screen display, but still had to be customized for different printers.

== Running on modern platforms ==
WordStar version 3.x used the MS-DOS File Control Block (FCB) interface, an early data structure for file input/output which was based closely on CP/M's file input/output functions. The provision of the FCB interface was intended to simplify the porting of (assembly language) programs from CP/M to the new MS-DOS. When MS-DOS adopted the Unix-like file interface of file handles, FCBs became a legacy interface supported for backward compatibility. Because FCB compatibility has not been maintained, WordStar 3.x will not function properly on modern versions of Windows. In particular, WordStar 3.x cannot save files.

One workaround is to use the DOSEMU emulator on Linux, which correctly implements the FCB interface; the DOSBox emulator does not, even on Linux. WordStar 4.0 does not have this problem because it uses the newer MS-DOS interface for input/output. OS/2 can run WordStar in a DOS session. Another option is using the FreeDOS operating system.

Another option is to run the CP/M versions of WordStar using a CP/M emulator, such as CPMEmu for Linux and the Raspberry Pi, or CP/M for OS X for macOS.

In October 2014, WordStar support was added to vDos, a derivative of DOSBox optimized for business applications; vDos allows WordStar 4.0 and above to run under 32- and 64-bit versions of Microsoft Windows from XP through 10. In 2024, Robert J. Sawyer released archives of WordStar capable of running on all modern platforms.

== Emulation ==
Although no current version of WordStar is available for modern operating systems, some former WordStar users still prefer WordStar's interface, especially the cursor diamond commands described earlier in this article. These users say that less hand movement is necessary to issue commands, and hence that writing under this interface is more efficient. The user accesses the nearby Ctrl key and then a letter or combination of letters, thus keeping his hands on or close to the home row instead of moving them away from it to reach for a specialty key or a mouse.

To accommodate these users, WordStar emulation programs were created. One such program is CtrlPlus by Yoji Hagiya, which remaps the standard PC keyboard, making many WordStar commands available in most Windows programs. CtrlPlus switches the Control and Caps Lock keys so that the Ctrl key is back where it was on older keyboards, next to the A key. It also gives functionality to the chief cursor diamond commands mentioned in this article.

Another WordStar emulation utility is 'WordStar Command Emulator for Microsoft Word', also known as 'WordStar for Word,' by Mike Petrie. Designed to work in conjunction with CtrlPlus, the Command Emulator adds many more WordStar commands to MS Word than CtrlPlus by itself, and also changes Word 97-XP's menus to be more like those of WordStar 7.0 for DOS, the last DOS version of WordStar. For example, ^K? was WordStar's word count command and ^QL was its spell check command. Hitting these commands in the WordStar Emulator within Word runs Word's equivalent commands. WordStar for Word also adds WordStar's block commands, namely ^KB to mark the beginning of a block, ^KK to mark the end, and ^KV to move it. Alternatively, ^KC could be used to copy the block. WordStar for Word works on all versions of Word from Word 97 through 2010.

The WordStar Command Emulator is written in Microsoft Visual Basic for Applications (VBA), a macro programming language based on Visual Basic built into Microsoft Word to allow for a high level of customization. Most Word add-ins are written in this language.

GNU Emacs used to come with a library 'wordstar-mode.el' that provides WordStar emulation, but it's been declared obsolete as of version 24.5. A macro set for vi that provides WordStar emulation is available.

The cross-platform JOE editor is a very WordStar-like alternative. When invoked as jstar, Joe emulates many WordStar keybindings. JOE lacks formatting options and essentially only operates in non-document mode, but formatted documents can be authored in HTML/CSS, Markdown or another markup language.

== Legacy ==
NewStar produced NewWord for Amstrad PCW 8256, PCW 8512 in the mid-1980s, running CP/M on 3-inch (76 mm) floppy disks. NewWord also was available for MS-DOS and in a native version for Concurrent CP/M. It was very similar to WordStar. LapStar was a cut-down clone for the TRS-80 Model 100 portable computer.

Since 2013 a partial WordStar clone has been in the process of being developed under the name of WordTsar. In addition German software author Martin Vieregg has sold the Write&Set package, a shareware GUI based WordStar clone for Microsoft Windows and OS/2–eComStation since the latter half of the 1990s, and for Linux and OS X as well.

== See also ==
- List of word processor programs
