= William Millard (businessman) =

American businessman (born 1932)

William H. Millard
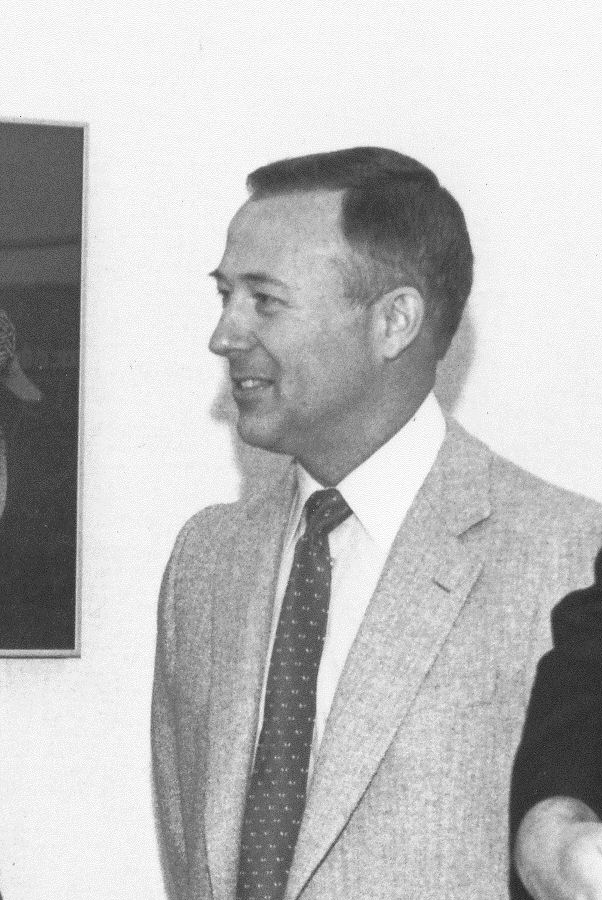
- Millard in 1983
- Born: 1932 (age 93–94)
- Children: Barbara Logan, Elisabeth Judith, Annie Keieser

William H. "Bill" Millard (born 1932) is the founder of IMS Associates, makers of the IMSAI series of computers, and the electronics retailer ComputerLand. He has also been called one of the world's most elusive tax exiles.

William H. Millard worked for IBM and, later, as the head of data processing for the city and county of San Francisco. In 1969, together with his wife, Millard started a software publisher company called Systems Dynamics, which went bankrupt in 1972.

In 1973, Millard founded IMS Associates, which is most famous for IMSAI 8080 microcomputer first shipped in late 1975. By 1977, IMSAI's product line included printers, terminals, floppy diskettes and software. To finance rapidly growing operations, IMSAI pledged 20% of its stock as convertible note in exchange for $250,000 from investment firm Marriner & Co.

In 1976, in partnership with John Martin-Musumeci, IMS launched a successful computer reseller franchise ComputerLand. In 1982, ComputerLand's sales reached over $400 million and by 1984 the venture reached over $1 billion in revenue.

ComputerLand during the 1980s grew to 800 stores, and Millard's portion was valued at $1 billion or more (equivalent to over $3 billion in 2025). Legal troubles from the failure of IMS, centered largely on a convertible note from the Marriner partnership that was later sold to a group of investors, led to a lawsuit in which Millard lost a substantial portion of his stake in ComputerLand. In 1987, he sold ComputerLand to E.M. Warburg, Pincus & Co. for about $200 million.

Millard and his family moved to Saipan where he removed himself from the public view. In September 2011, after 20 years, he was found living in the Cayman Islands. In 2013, Millard and his wife, Patricia, obtained bankruptcy protection in the Cayman Islands from the government of the Northern Mariana Islands for owing $118 million in unpaid taxes and interest.
