= IMSAI 8080 =

Microcomputer

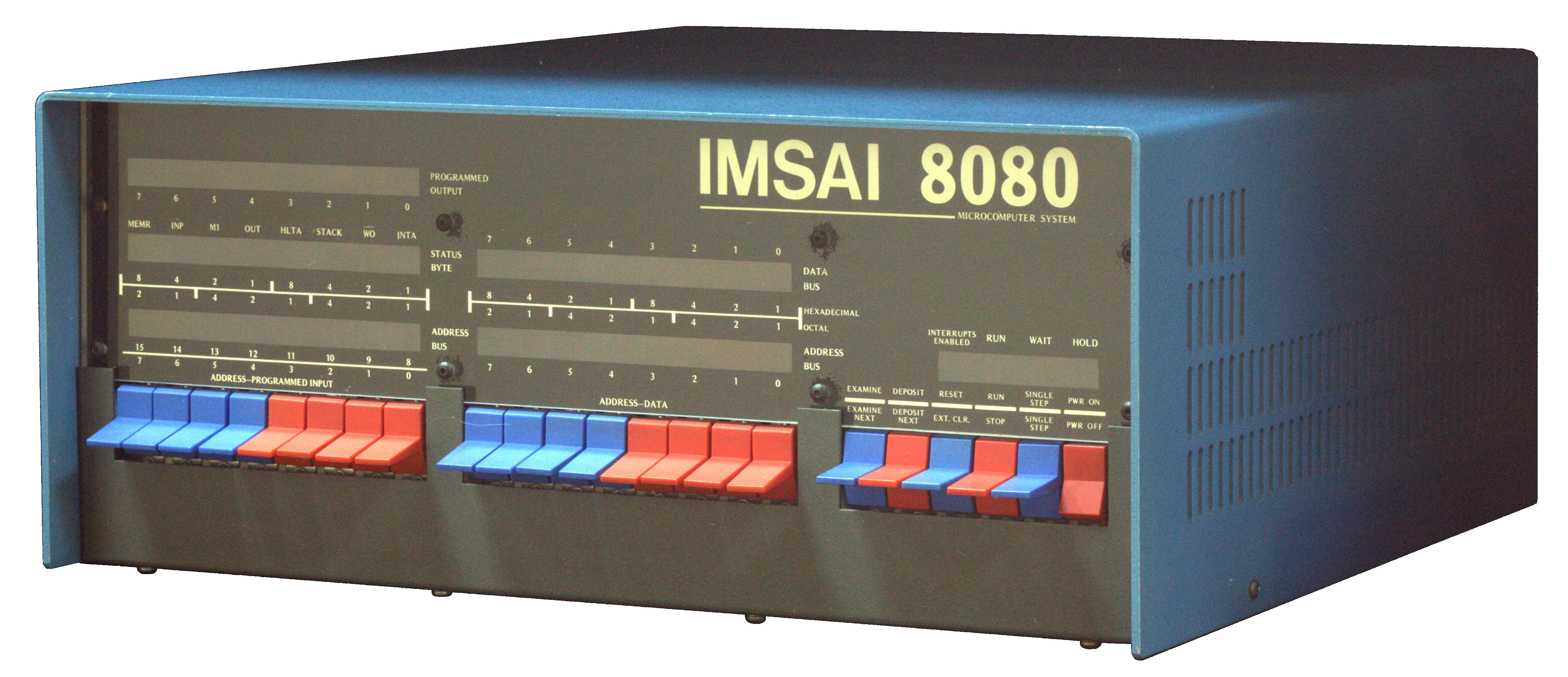
- Manufacturer: IMS Associates, Inc., later IMSAI Manufacturing Corporation
- Type: Hobbyist computer, aluminum casing, 22-slot motherboard, S-100 bus
- Released: December 1975; 50 years ago
- Discontinued: 1978
- Operating system: First commercial supplier of Digital Research's CP/M, later followed by derived IMDOS; BASIC, FORTRAN
- CPU: Intel 8080/8085A @ 2 MHz/3 MHz
- Memory: 256/4K bytes on a 4K board (static), 16K, 32K, 64K DRAM
- Storage: Optional Compact Cassette or 5 1/4" and 8" floppy drives, hard drives (CDC Hawk— 5 MB fixed, 5 MB removable)
- Website: www.imsai.net

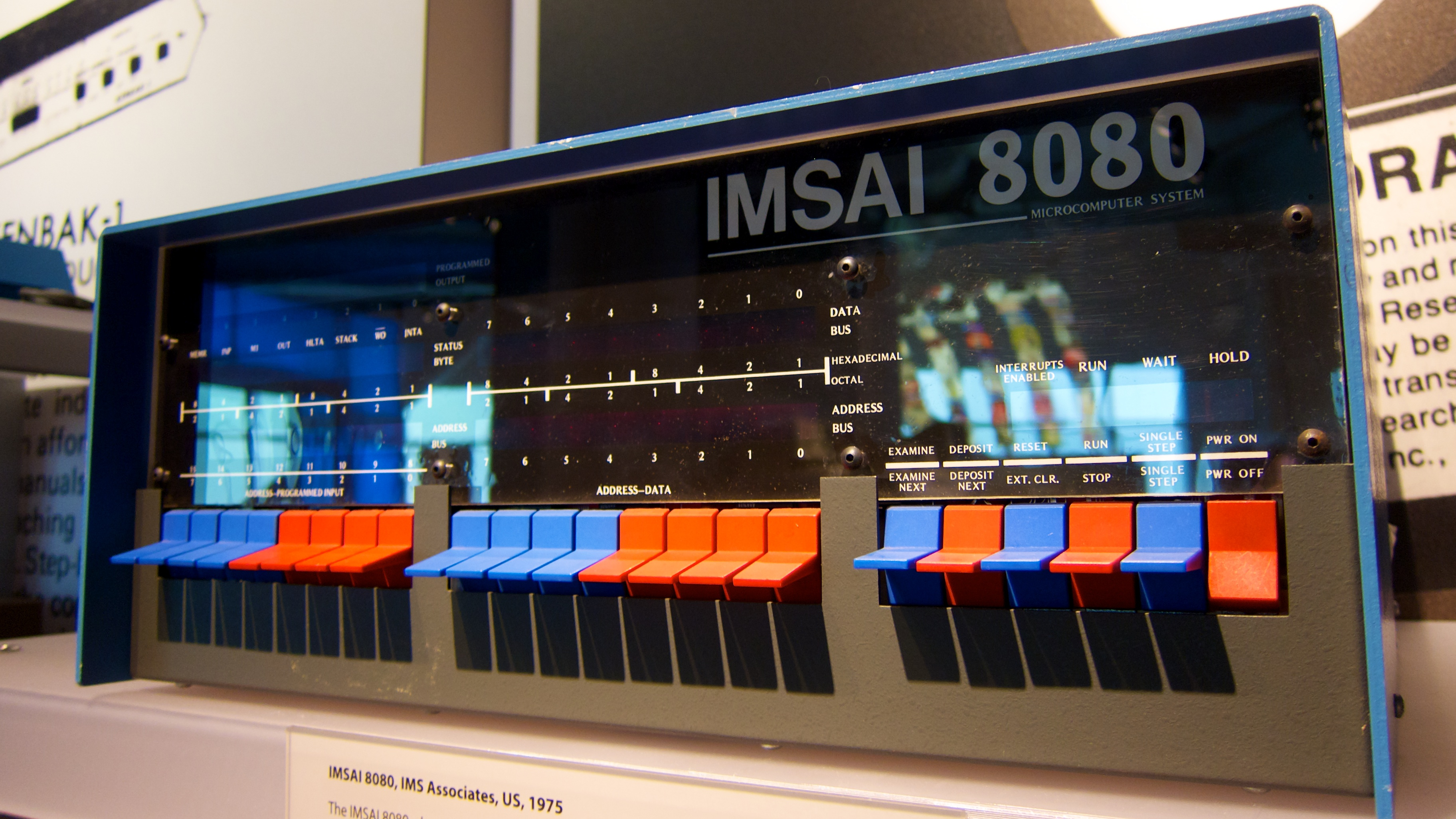
Closeup of IMSAI 8080 front panel

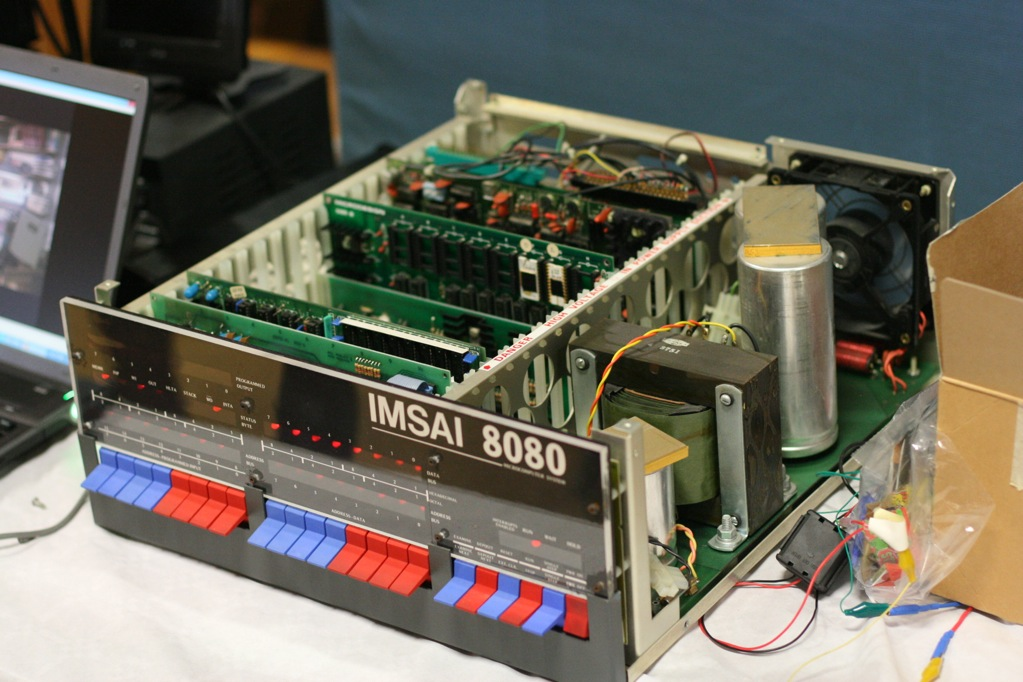
A look inside the IMSAI 8080. The power transformer is on the right-hand side.

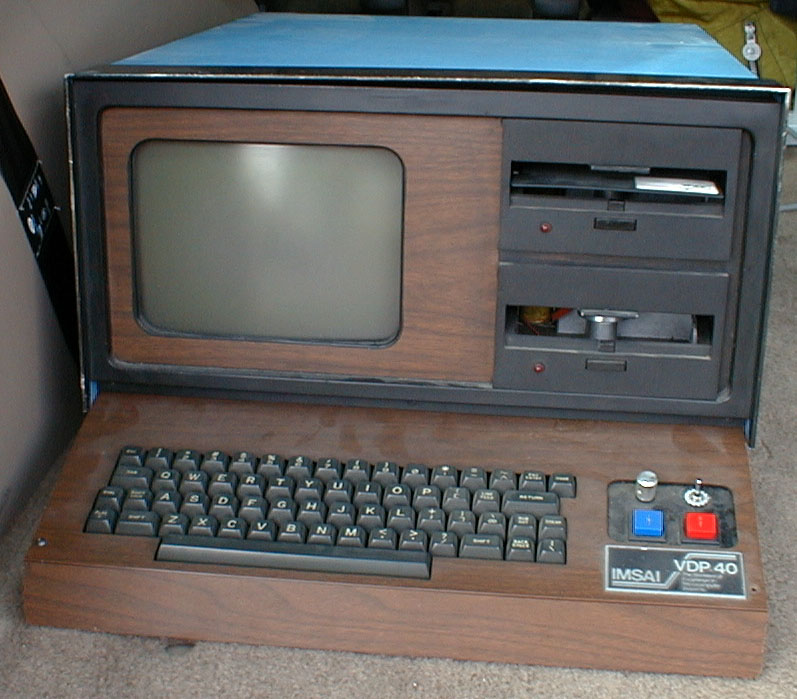
IMSAI VDP-40 desktop computer of 1977-1979. Intel 8085, 32/64KB RAM, 2× FDD 80/160KB, S-100 bus. 2KB monitor ROM, 2KB Video ROM

The IMSAI 8080 is an early microcomputer released in late 1975, based on the Intel 8080 (and later 8085) and S-100 bus. It is a clone of its main competitor, the earlier MITS Altair 8800. The IMSAI is largely regarded as the first "clone" microcomputer. The IMSAI machine runs a highly modified version of the CP/M operating system called IMDOS. It was developed, manufactured and sold by IMS Associates, Inc. (later renamed to IMSAI Manufacturing Corp). In total, between 17,000 and 20,000 units were produced from 1975 to 1978.

== History ==
In May 1972, William Millard started a business called IMS Associates (IMS) in the areas of computer consulting and engineering, using his home as an office. By 1973, Millard incorporated the business and soon found funding for it, receiving several contracts, all for software. IMS stood for "Information Management Services".

In 1974, IMS was contacted by a client which wanted a "workstation system" that could complete jobs for any General Motors car dealership. IMS planned a system including a terminal, small computer, printer, and special software. Five of these workstations were to have common access to a hard disk drive, which would be controlled by a small computer. Eventually product development was stopped.

Millard and his chief engineer Joe Killian turned to the microprocessor. Intel had announced the 8080 chip, and compared to the 4004 to which IMS Associates had been first introduced, it looked like a "real computer". Full-scale development of the IMSAI 8080 was put into action using the existing Altair 8800's S-100 bus, and by October 1975 an ad was placed in Popular Electronics, receiving positive reactions.

IMS shipped the first IMSAI 8080 kits on 16 December 1975, before turning to fully assembled units. In 1976, IMS was renamed to IMSAI Manufacturing Corporation because by then, they were a manufacturing company, not a consulting firm.

In 1977, IMSAI marketing director Seymour I. Rubinstein paid Gary Kildall $25,000 for the right to run CP/M version 1.3, which eventually evolved into an operating system called IMDOS, on IMSAI 8080 computers. Other manufacturers followed and CP/M eventually became the de facto standard 8-bit operating system.

By October 1979, the IMSAI corporation was bankrupt. The VDP (all-in-one) computer had sold poorly and was not competitive with the Radio Shack TRS-80, Commodore PET, and Apple II computers. The 'IMSAI' trademark was acquired by Thomas "Todd" Fischer and Nancy Freitas (former early employees of IMS Associates), who continued manufacturing the computers under the IMSAI name as a division of Fischer-Freitas Co. Support for early IMSAI systems continues. The first registration of the trademark IMSAI was on 17 January 1980. The right to the word mark IMSAI expired on 6 April 2004 because Thomas Fischer did not correctly submit the required documents for renewal.

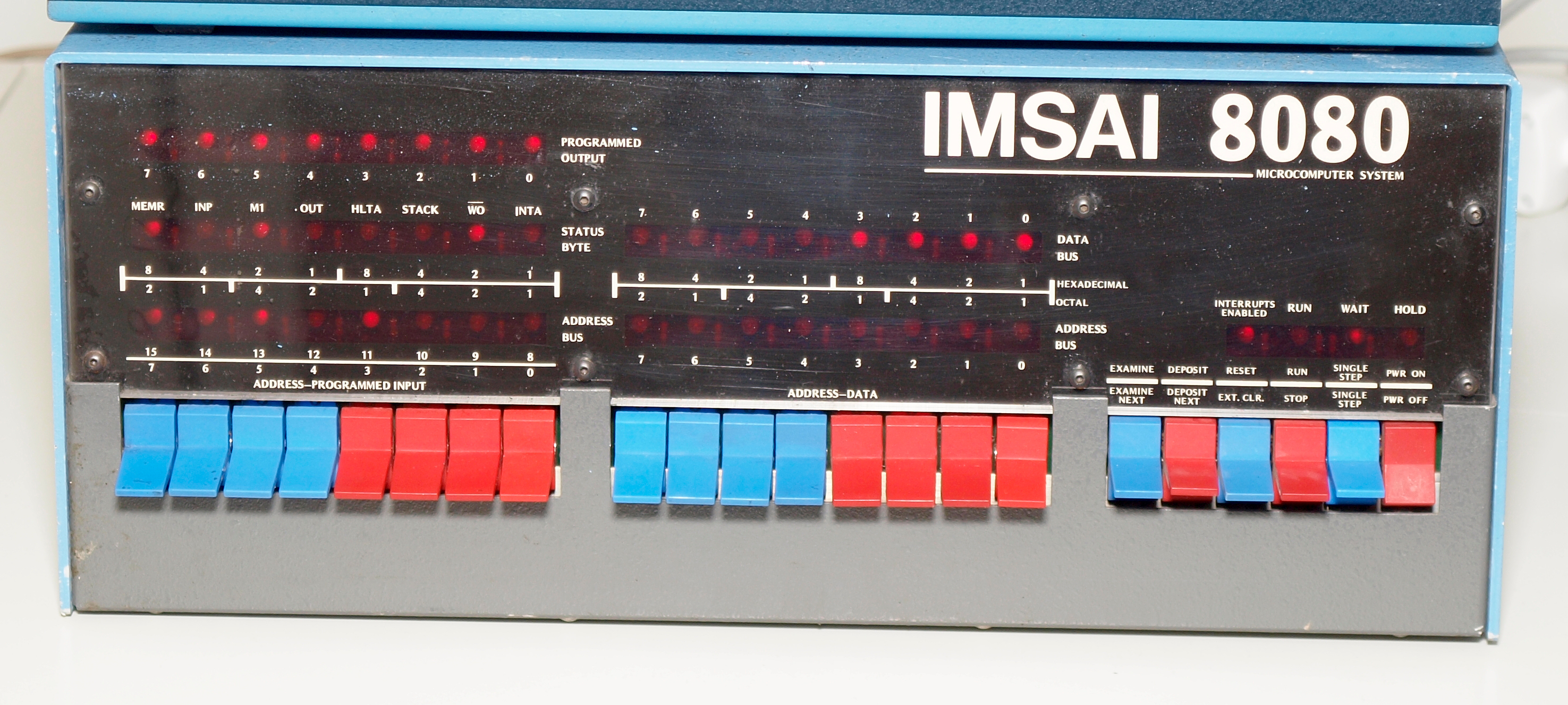
A running IMSAI 8080 at Enter Technikwelt Solothurn

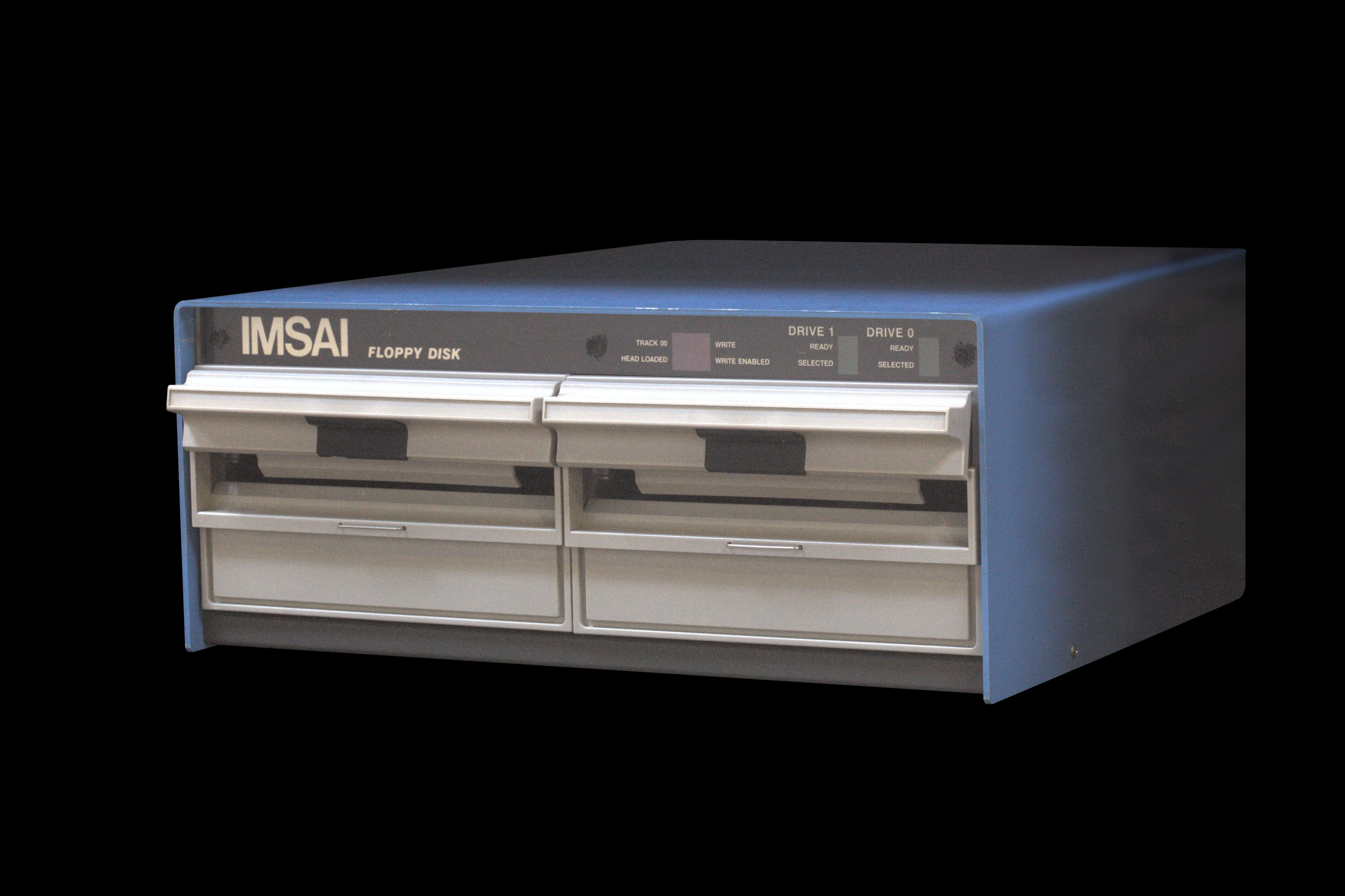
Floppy disk unit

IMSAI 8080 replicas have entered the market, due in part to the legality of copying hardware designs encouraging amateur technophiles to make backwards compatible machines, with the retro aesthetics. The color scheme matches the original IMS 1973 "Hypercube" project, but some peripherals such as the floppy are simulated and instead use Wi-fi.

== VDP series ==
In mid-1977, IMSAI released the VDP-series, based on the Intel 8085. According to the product description of January 1978, many different models were released, with 32K or 64K memory and a 9" (VDP4x-range) or 12" (VDP8x-range) video display. For example, the VDP-40 had two 5-1/4" disk drives, a 9" 40-character-wide display and a 2K ROM monitor all in one cabinet. The built-in keyboard had a 8035 microprocessor and a serial interface to the main board. The VIO-C video board had 2K firmware ROM, 2K character generator read-only memory (ROM) with 256 characters and 2K of refresh memory.

The VDP80/1050 was listed in January 1978 for $10,920 and the VDP-40/64 for $7,466.
