= Munchers =

- Genre: Educational
- Developer: MECC
- Publisher: MECC
- Original release: 1980s-1990s

Munchers is a series of educational video games produced by the Minnesota Educational Computing Consortium (MECC) for several operating systems. The series was popular among American schoolchildren in the 1980s and 1990s and were the recipients of several awards. The two original games in the series were Number Munchers and Word Munchers. The brand name is currently owned by Houghton Mifflin Harcourt, but is defunct.

Number Munchers is the first educational game in the Munchers series. Designed to teach basic math skills, it was popular among American school children in the 1980s and 1990s and was the recipient of several awards. An updated 3D version, Math Munchers Deluxe, was released in 1995. Word Munchers is a spin-off of Number Munchers designed to teach basic grammar skills. It was popular among American schoolchildren in the 1980s and 1990s and was used as a teaching aid widely used in schools. Though the gameplay was the same as in Number Munchers, specific to Word Munchers were the modes of play, which includes parts of speech such as verbs or adjectives. Teachers had the options to select the vowel sounds and how difficult the word sets would be, such as whether to include words that break pronunciation rules. These games were followed up by other titles that focused on areas like fractions (Fraction Munchers) and trivia (Knowledge Munchers Deluxe), and the original games also received deluxe versions.

== Entries ==
The Munchers series included:

- Word Munchers
- Number Munchers
- Fraction Munchers
- Super Munchers
- Math Munchers Deluxe (a remake of Number Munchers)
- Word Munchers Deluxe (also a remake of Word Munchers)
- Math Munchers for the 21st Century
- Word Munchers for the 21st Century
- Knowledge Munchers Deluxe (originally released as "Trivia Munchers Deluxe")
- Troggle Trouble Math (a spin-off)

The original version only allowed navigation through the keyboard arrow keys. Later versions featured better graphics and added mouse support.

== Gameplay ==
The green muncher and a red troggle monster in the lower left (MS-DOS).

In all the Munchers games, the player controls a green "Muncher" character across a grid of squares containing a short numerical or word expression. The objective is to consume all and only the grids containing information satisfying a specific criterion (determined by the mode of play) while also avoiding the deadly "Troggle" monsters which roamed the grid.

Eating a grid containing information that did not match the criterion of the play mode chosen or being caught by a Troggle resulted in the loss of a life.

If all grids containing information matching the criterion were eaten from the screen, the level ended. After every three levels, the player is presented with a comedic short scene. Similar to the Wile E. Coyote and the Road Runner cartoons, the scenes often involve a Troggle planning to catch the Muncher, where either the Muncher foils the Troggle in some comical manner, or the Troggle's plan backfires. The game gets continually faster and harder with each level.
