= Jill Barad =

American businessperson (born 1951)

- Born: Jill Elikann; May 23, 1951 (age 75); New York, New York, U.S.
- Education: Queens College
- Known for: CEO of Mattel (1997–2000)
- Spouse: Thomas Barad (m. 1979)

Jill Barad (/bəˈrɑːd/; née Elikann; born May 23, 1951) is an American businesswoman from New York City, who was CEO of Mattel from 1997 to 2000.

== Career ==
Jill Barad graduated with a Bachelor of Arts degree in English Literature and Psychology from Queens College in New York. In college, she worked in cosmetics sales and then became brand manager for the full line of Coty products. After moving to Los Angeles, she was an account executive for the Max Factor brand at Wells, Rich, Greene/West advertising agency. She started working at Mattel as a product manager in 1981 and was named CEO and Chairman of the Board in 1997.

Barad was one of four women to lead a Fortune 500 company at the time. She helped transform Mattel from a toy company into a premier global family products company. In 1998, Mattel acquired Pleasant Company, the maker of the American Girl line of dolls, for $700 million.

On behalf of Mattel, Barad donated $25 million to UCLA to rebuild its Children's Hospital in 1998. The facility is now named the Mattel Children's Hospital.

She resigned from the company in February 2000 under pressure from investors following disappointing earnings, largely a result of the acquisition of The Learning Company. She received almost $50 million in severance pay.

Barad has served on several corporate boards, including Microsoft, Bank of America and Pixar Animation Studios. She was a member of the UCLA Executive Board for the Medical Sciences and the UC Health Services Advisory Committee. She was the Vice Chairman of Town Hall Los Angeles, on the board of fellows of Claremont University Center and Graduate School, trustee emeritus of the Queens College Foundation, and a board member of Girls, Inc. She was also chairman of the executive advisory board of the Children Affected by AIDS Foundation, which she co-founded.

== Personal life ==
Barad is the daughter of Hollywood director Larry Elikann (1923–2004).

Jill and her husband Tom continued their philanthropic efforts at UCLA and The Barad Family Children's Bone Marrow Transplant Unit is named after them in the Mattel Children's Hospital.
