= Inacom =

Former Omaha-based PC seller, once third-largest U.S. distributor

Inacom Corporation
- Company type: Public
- Traded as: NYSE: ICO
- Industry: Computer resale
- Predecessor: ValCom Inc.; Inacomp Computer Centers
- Founded: 1991; 35 years ago
- Founder: William L. "Bill" Fairfield
- Defunct: June 16, 2000
- Fate: Bankruptcy liquidation
- Number of employees: 12,000 (1998)
- Website: inacom.com at the Wayback Machine (archived 1999-04-29)

Inacom Corporation was an American seller of PC's and services based in Omaha, Nebraska, at one point being the third-largest and most profitable computer distributor in the United States.

== History ==
=== Origins ===
The company created in 1991 from the merger of ValCom Inc. and Inacomp Computer Centers Inc. ValCom Inc. was founded in 1982 by William L. "Bill" Fairfield.

In 1997, Inacom entered the Fortune 500 list at position 436 and remained a Fortune 500 company until 2000. Throughout this time, Bill Fairfield served as president and chief executive officer of Inacom.

=== Acquisition of Vanstar ===
On October 9, 1998, Inacom purchased Vanstar for a reported $465 - $480 million. The resulting company employed nearly 12,000 and was estimated to generate $7 billion in revenue.

The acquisition of Vanstar reportedly added a large amount of debt, and it has been said that Inacom overpaid too much for a company of that size. Vanstar had 43.26 million shares outstanding at the time the deal was struck, and shareholders of Vanstar received .64 shares of ICO for each VST share in a stock swap deal, thus the issuance of 27.7 M shares of stock effectively more than doubled the number of outstanding shares while also being dilutive to the existing shares. This, plus debt concerns, led to a decline in the price of Inacom's stock.

Furthermore, the acquisition of Vanstar added unrealized credits posted to Inacom's balance sheet, necessitating the requirement to restate financials, and a failure to report financials for 1999 and the first quarter of 2000. As the result of the failure to file the necessary SEC documents, existing credit agreements were terminated and the company had difficulty in arranging new financing. Inacom's failure to file SEC documents also resulted in the New York Stock Exchange delisting Inacom (ICO) since they no longer met listing requirements.

=== Bankruptcy ===
On January 4, 2000, Inacom sold their distribution business to Compaq for $369.5 million.

On January 7, IBM severed their business partner relationship which hurt Inacom badly. On June 16, 2000, only twenty months after the acquisition of Vanstar, Inacom filed for chapter 11 bankruptcy and terminated all employees.

Compaq was itself purchased in 2002 by Hewlett-Packard.
