= Seymour I. Rubinstein =

American PC software pioneer (1934–2020)

- Born: April 14, 1934
- Died: November 12, 2020 (aged 86)
- Occupation: Software developer

Seymour Ivan Rubinstein (April 14, 1934 – November 12, 2020) was an American businessman and software developer. With the founding of MicroPro International in 1978, he became a pioneer of personal computer software, publishing the popular word processing package, WordStar. He grew up in Brooklyn, New York, and after a six-year stint in New Hampshire, later moved to California. Programs developed under his direction include WordStar, HelpDesk, Quattro Pro, and WebSleuth, among others. WordStar was the first truly successful program for the personal computer in a commercial sense and gave reasonably priced access to word processing for the general population for the first time.

Rubinstein began his involvement with microcomputers as director of marketing at IMSAI.

Rubinstein died on November 12, 2020, at the age of 86.

== Early career ==
During his teenage years, Rubinstein was a television repairman. After his military service he became a technical writer and continued his undergraduate studies at night.

In 1964, he was given the opportunity to participate in the design and implementation a classified system for identifying unknown vessels at sea by their sound fingerprint. Following his success with this and other related projects, he moved to New Hampshire to be put in charge of the computer software development for a line of IBM compatible programmable CRT terminals. As part of this assignment, Rubinstein went to San Francisco. Two years later, Rubinstein moved to the Bay Area and landed an assignment to implement a law office management system on a Varian Data Machines minicomputer. Following this, he formed the Systems Division of Prodata International Corporation which was subsequently acquired by Varian Data Machines. As a consequence, Rubinstein temporarily moved to Zürich, Switzerland to utilize the technology he developed as part of a branch banking system for Credit Suisse.

Upon his return to California, he visited the Byte Shop of San Rafael and began his love affair with the microcomputer.

== Business ventures ==
Rubinstein founded MicroPro International Corporation in June 1978. Subsequently, Rubinstein made an arrangement with Rob Barnaby, a programmer Rubinstein met at IMSAI. While at IMSAI, Barnaby wrote a screen editor which was called NED. Rubinstein had Barnaby totally rewrite NED into a new product, WordMaster. MicroPro was officially launched in September, 1978 using Barnaby's first two programs, WordMaster and SuperSort. Feedback from the computer store dealers, who were MicroPro's first customers, said they wanted a program with integrated printing.

Rubinstein developed the specifications for the new program including many innovations unavailable in commercial word processing at the time, such as showing page breaks, providing an integrated help system and a keyboard design specifically for touch typists. Barnaby did the initial foundation for MailMerge, which was finished by others.

The WordStar word processor was published in 1979 for the IMSAI 8080 and microcomputers running CP/M. Several IMSAI employees later joined Rubinstein at Micropro, including Bruce H. Van Natta, A. Joseph "Joe" Killian, Dianne Hajicek, and Glenn Ewing.

WordStar was adapted for MS-DOS and released as version 3.0 in April 1982.

"So while WordMaster, SuperSort, and WordStar were developed on IMSAIs (I used mine til I got an IBM PC), few customers used them."
— Rob Barnaby in email to Mike Petrie, 2 May 2000

In 1987 Rubinstein became involved with a spreadsheet he called Surpass. This spreadsheet was later sold to Borland International, which renamed it Quattro Pro.

In 1990 Rubinstein was sued by Bill Millard, former CEO of IMSAI, regarding theft of trade secrets regarding WordStar. Rubinstein was successfully defended by Davis Wright Tremaine .

In a Video History Interview with David Allison of the Smithsonian Institution, Bill Gates referred to Rubinstein as starting one of the first software companies .

In 1992 he founded UDICO Holdings, a company which, using a "surveillance engine" licensed from a French company, sought to create an interactive context sensitive help engine which would intercept "F1" calls for help within Microsoft Word and direct users at that point to an interactive training session for the feature which they sought help with. Though this product (Developed by T. Lindgren and A. Bennedsen) was never released, the company did release a WinHelp authoring tool called W.Y.S.I. Help Composer.

In 1995 he founded a company called Prompt Software to investigate document management, internet research, and worked with Garnet R. Chaney to patent a series of discoveries regarding Content Discovery. This software connected to multiple search sites and used complex word algorithms to refine searches.
