= Word Munchers =

1985 video game

- Cover art
- Developer: MECC
- Publisher: MECC
- Designer: R. Philip Bouchard
- Platforms: Apple II, MS-DOS, Macintosh, Windows (Deluxe)
- Release: Apple II: 1985; MS-DOS/Mac: 1991; Deluxe: 1996
- Genre: Educational
- Mode: Single-player

Word Munchers is a 1985 video game and the first of the Munchers educational series. It was made by MECC for Apple II, then ported to MS-DOS and Macintosh in 1991. It was re-released in 1996 for Microsoft Windows and Macintosh as Word Munchers Deluxe. The concept of the game was designed by R. Philip Bouchard, who also designed The Oregon Trail.

== Gameplay ==
The player controls the Muncher who must move around a grid eating words that match a condition at the top of the screen, while avoiding the threatening Troggles. As the player progresses through the levels, the difficulty of the matching conditions increases, and multiple Troggles pursue the Muncher.

== Educational goals ==
The game was designed for first- to fifth-grade students, emphasizing vowel sounds, while teaching students grammar, phonics and reading skills in addition to introducing new words.

== Reception ==
Reception

Award
Publication	Award
Parent's Choice	Gold Award 1986
