= IMS Associates, Inc. =

IMS Associates
- Type: Private
- Industry: Computers
- Founded: 1973; 53 years ago in San Leandro, California
- Founder: William Millard
- Defunct: October 1979
- Fate: Bankruptcy
- Products: IMSAI 8080

IMS Associates, Inc., or IMSAI, was a microcomputer company, responsible for one of the earliest successes in personal computing, the IMSAI 8080. The company was founded in 1973 by William Millard and was based in San Leandro, California. Their first product launch was the IMSAI 8080 in 1975. One of the company's subsidiaries was ComputerLand. IMS stood for "Information Management Sciences".

IMS Associates required all executives and key employees to take the EST Standard Training. Forbes considered Millard's requirements - which placed a heavy emphasis on self-actualization and encouraged vast discrepancies between executives and staff - were a key contributor to the downfall of the company, and Paul Freiberger and Michael Swaine concurred in Fire in the Valley: The Making of The Personal Computer, noting that Millard's EST-induced unwillingness to admit a task might be impossible was a key factor in IMSAI's demise.

== History ==
=== Consultancy ===
In May 1972, William Millard began business individually as IMS Associates (IMS) in the area of computer consultancy and engineering, using his home as an office. The work done by IMS was similar to that Millard had done previously for the city and county of San Francisco. By 1973, Millard founded IMS Associates, Inc. Millard soon found capital for his business, and received several contracts, all for software. IMS provided advanced engineering and software management to mainframe users, including business and the United States Government.

=== IMSAI 8080 ===
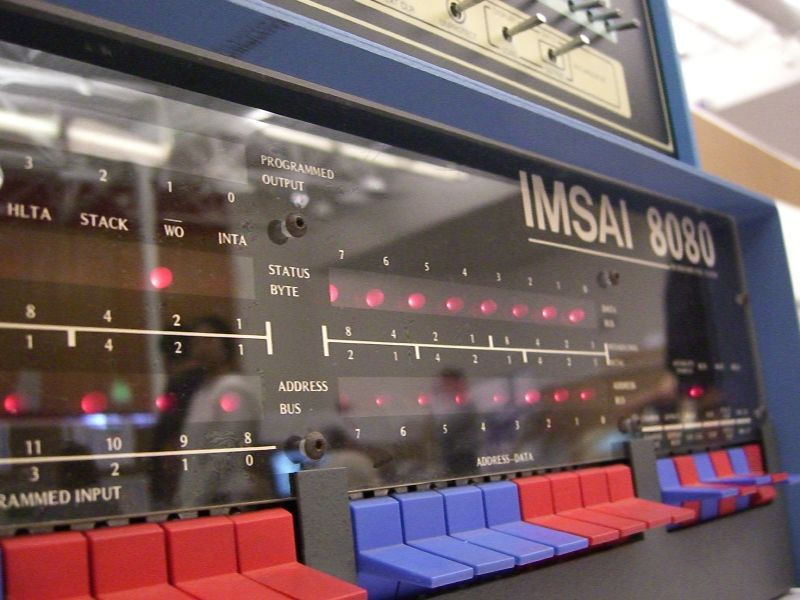
The IMSAI 8080

In 1974, IMS was contacted by a client which wanted a "workstation system" that could complete jobs for any General Motors new-car dealership. IMS planned a system including a terminal, small computer, printer, and special software. Five of these work stations were to have common access to a hard disk, which would be controlled by a small computer. Eventually, product development was stopped. Millard and his chief engineer Joe Killian turned to the microprocessor.

Intel had announced the 8080 chip, and compared to the 4004 to which IMS Associates had been first introduced, the 8080 looked like a "real computer". Full-scale development of the IMSAI 8080 was put into action, and by October 1975 an ad was placed in Popular Electronics, receiving positive reactions. IMS shipped the first IMSAI 8080 kits on 16 December 1975 and shortly after turned to fully assembled units. Between 17,000 and 20,000 units were eventually produced, with an additional 2500 produced under the Fischer-Freitas name thereafter.

=== Transition ===
In 1976, as IMS had completed its transition from a consultancy firm into a manufacturing firm, the name of the company was changed to IMSAI Manufacturing Corporation.

=== ComputerLand ===
The release of the Z80 by Zilog in 1976 quickly put an end to the dominance of 8080 machines as the new chip had an improved instruction set, could be clocked at faster speeds, and had on-chip DRAM refresh. IMSAI sales quickly plummeted and so in 1977 Millard decided to take the company through another transition, this time from a computer manufacturing company to a computer retailer. He established a chain of franchised retail outlets, initially called Computer Shack (the name was changed to ComputerLand following legal threats from Radio Shack).

ComputerLand retailed not only IMSAI 8080s, but also computers from companies including Apple, North Star, and Cromemco. The 8080 sold poorly in comparison, and IMSAI developed the IMSAI VDP-80, an all-in-one computer which worked poorly. Many franchise dealers refused to retail most IMSAI products except those that retained popularity including the IMSAI 8080. With most of the IMSAI resources stripped to fund ComputerLand's expansion, and with Millard's attention diverted, IMS Associates, Inc. went into a "tailspin", and filed for bankruptcy in October 1979.

The trademark was eventually acquired by Thomas "Todd" Fischer and Nancy Freitas (former early employees who undertook continued support after the parent company folded), now doing business as Fischer-Freitas Company (since October 1978), who continued manufacturing and service support under their newly acquired and trademarked IMSAI badge (such as the IMSAI Series Two), and continue support to this day. ComputerLand stores continued to prosper retailing IBM computers until IBM abandoned the 8-bit ISA bus in 1984; the franchises became independent following a series of bitter and costly legal battles with Millard. The right to the word mark IMSAI expired on 2004-04-06 because Thomas Fischer did not correctly submit the required documents for renewal.

== Pop culture ==
- WarGames (1983 film), in which the IMSAI 8080 appeared in a key role
