= Trek-80 =

1976 video game

- Developer: Steve Dompier
- Publishers: Processor Technology, Judges Guild, Tandy
- Platforms: S-100 bus, TRS-80
- Release: 1976

Trek-80 is a text-based video game written by Steve Dompier in 1976 and sold by Processor Technology for their Sol-20 computer and suitable S-100 bus machines.

Trek-80 combines features of the seminal Star Trek game by Mike Mayfield with the unrelated Trek73. In contrast to the originals, which were designed to run on teletypes, Trek-80 used the VDM-1 video card to produce a character-based real-time display.

Compatible 3rd party versions of the VDM-1 became the de facto display for most early S-100 bus machines, as well as the TRS-80. A version known as Invasion Force was sold by Tandy for the TRS-80.

An unrelated Trek-80 for the TRS-80 was sold by Judges Guild, but this was a port of the original Mayfield game with few changes.

== Gameplay ==
Dompier's Trek-80 was mostly based on Mike Mayfield's original version, with only minor changes in the underlying gameplay concepts. The game took place in a section of the galaxy divided into "quadrants", each of which held a particular number of stars, enemy ships and starbases where the player could repair and refuel. The main difference in layout was that Trek-80's quadrants had 10-by-10 sectors within them, compared to the original 8-by-8 layout.

In the original Star Trek, the display was linear and turn-based. Players would normally start the game by issuing the LRS (long range scan) command to scan the immediate surrounding quadrants and then fly to a selected one using the WARp drive. On arrival, they would use the SRS (short range scan) to display the sectors in the quadrant and begin moving and firing at any targets. SRS was normally used multiple times in combat as the ships maneuvered.

The basic action is the same in Trek-80, but the display is no longer linear and takes place in real-time. The LRS and SRS displays are always visible and update as the game proceeds. Other displays, like the status of the ship and various help texts, were displayed around the screen, eliminating the need to constantly issue commands related to inquiring about basic status. Instead of, for instance, warping to another quadrant by specifying a range, in Trek-80 one simply starts warping in a selected direction, watches the display until they arrive, and then presses ESCcape to end movement. Likewise, when one fired a torpedo, the other ships continued to move while it flew, and it could be detonated early by the player pressing ESC.

Other changes to the original game included two types of Klingon ships. One was the traditional ship which the player would shoot at, while the Battle Cruiser could only be destroyed by dropping an antimatter pod in the quadrant and then manually detonating it when it approached the Cruiser. It also added space mines that destroy everything in a quadrant if hit, and "unknown" objects that could be explored. Dompier also added basic sound effects which could be heard by placing an AM radio near the computer, a technique he had pioneered during demonstrations for the Homebrew Computer Club.

Invasion Force differs only in minor ways from the original; the player is in command of the USS Hephaestus and battles the "Jovians", but the game is otherwise similar.

== Development ==
Dompier began development of Trek-80 while the first commercial versions of VDM-1 were being developed at the newly-created Processor Technology, which had formed to sell add-in cards for the recently released Altair 8800 computer. Dompier was familiar with Trek73, and had purchased a teleprinter so he could play a copy running on the DECISION computer at the Lawrence Hall of Science from home.

== Reception ==
Steve North reviewed Trek-80 and an S-100 version of Spacewar! in the August 1977 issue of Creative Computing. He noted that Trek-80 was far less demanding in terms of system requirements, needing only a VDM-1, while Spacewar! required a Cromemco Dazzler with two joysticks and an I/O card to run them. On the other hand he found the graphics of Spacewar more striking. He mentions that David Ahl was playing Trek-80 and "seemed bent on blowing up as many objects as possible without regard for what they were." The game sold for $9.50 on cassette, or $14.50 on punched tape.

Glenn Mai reviewed Invasion Force in The Space Gamer No. 36. Mai commented that "If you don't have a Star Trek game and want one, get Invasion Force."
