= Multifunction card =

Expansion card for personal computers

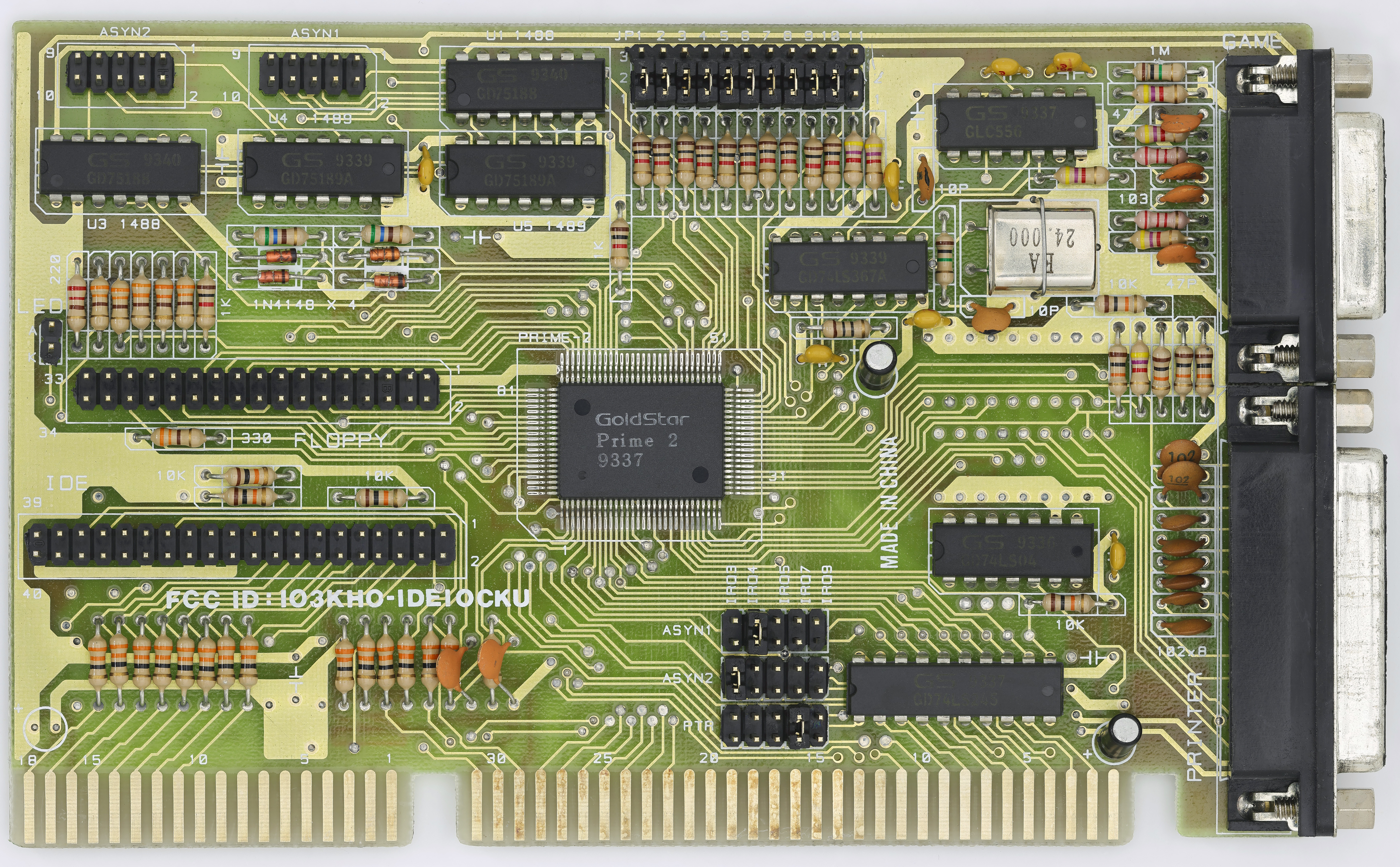
A multi-I/O card from 1993, manufactured by GoldStar

A multifunction card, also known as a multifunction board, is a type of expansion card for personal computers (PCs) that combines the functions of multiple single-purpose cards in order to free up expansion slots for use with other cards. A multifunction card may combine the functionality of, for example, a random-access memory (RAM) card, a real-time clock (RTC) card, and a game port card.

A multi-I/O card is a type of multifunction card that specifically combines the functions of cards dedicated to input/output (I/O), including serial, parallel, floppy, and hard disk controller cards.

== History ==
Early multifunction cards were created for S-100 computers such as the Altair 8800. One of the first is the popular Processor Technology 3P+S that first appeared in 1976. It offers one serial port and three parallel ports.

Multifunction cards had their heyday in the 1980s, especially with the rise of the IBM Personal Computer, which initially required several dedicated expansion cards for basic functionality (such as outputting video and controlling the disk drives), leaving few vacant slots for the user to install additional cards. Multifunction cards were also popular among Apple II users.

The most popular of the early multifunction cards was the AST SixPakPlus for the IBM PC, which combines a serial card, parallel printer card, a RTC card, and a 384-KB-maximum RAM card. The SixPak proved so popular that one in six PCs and PC compatibles had the card by the end of 1984,, and many "SixPak clones" appeared, even while AST estimated in 1985 that half of all PCs lacked any upgrades.

With desktop computers, multifunction card became increasingly obsolete as the functionality of these cards began to be integrated into the motherboards of PCs, a trend that started in the late 1980s and solidified by the early 2000s. With laptops and subnotebooks, the multifunction card concept persisted for several more years with PC Cards; many laptops had only one or two slots for such cards, leading to many manufacturers developing multifunction PC Cards that, for example, combined modem cards with memory-expansion cards.
