= Sol-20 =

8-bit computer introduced in 1976

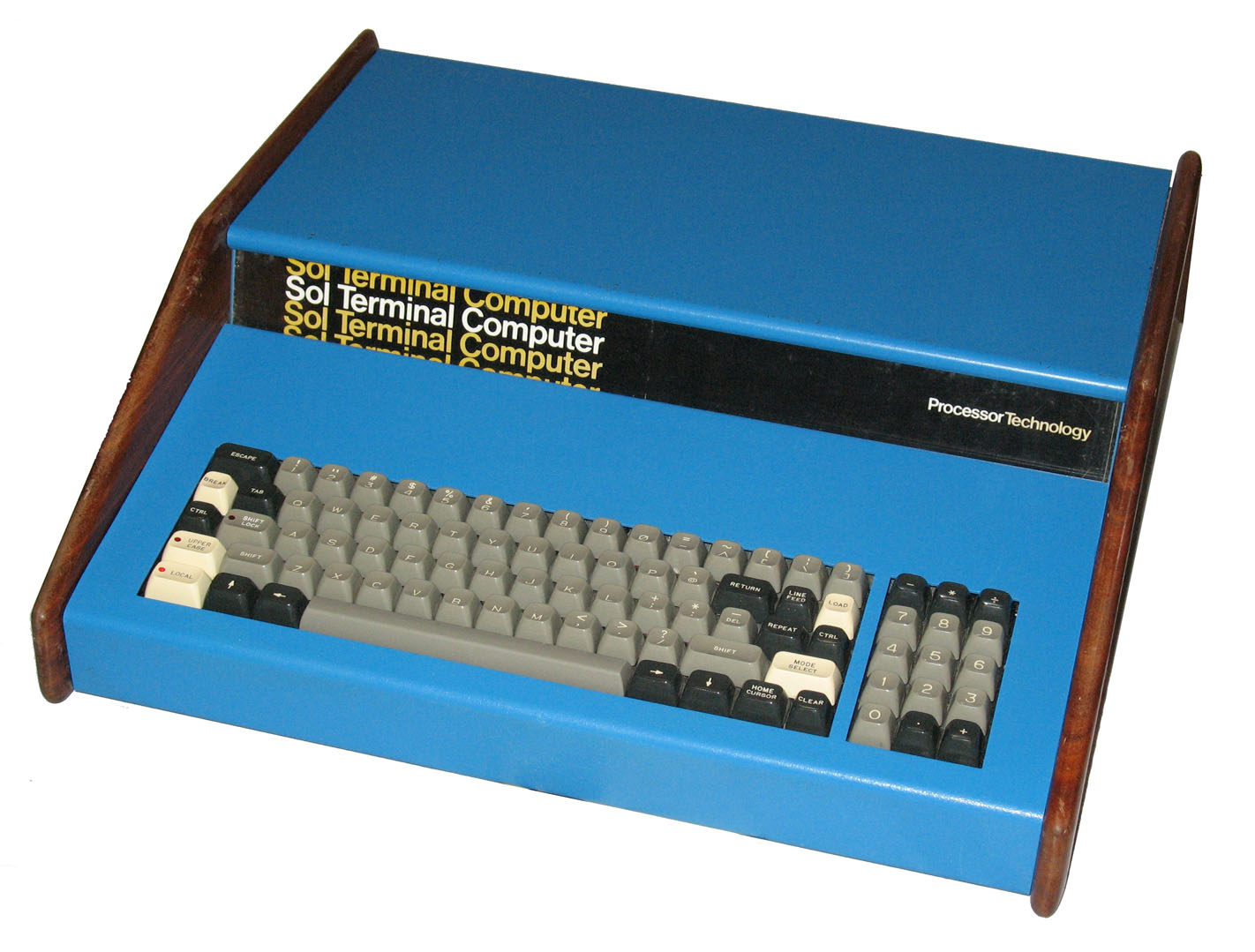
- The Sol-20, referred to as a "terminal computer", was an early all-in-one personal computer.
- Developer: Processor Technology
- Manufacturer: Processor Technology
- Type: Microcomputer
- Released: 1976; 50 years ago
- Introductory price: $1,495
- Discontinued: 1979; 47 years ago
- Units sold: 12,000
- Media: Cassette tape
- Operating system: SOLOS, CONSOL or SOLED OS
- CPU: Intel 8080
- Memory: 8 to 48 KB
- Display: 64 x 16 character text
- Graphics: VDM-1
- Connectivity: RS-232, cassette input/output, S100 Bus

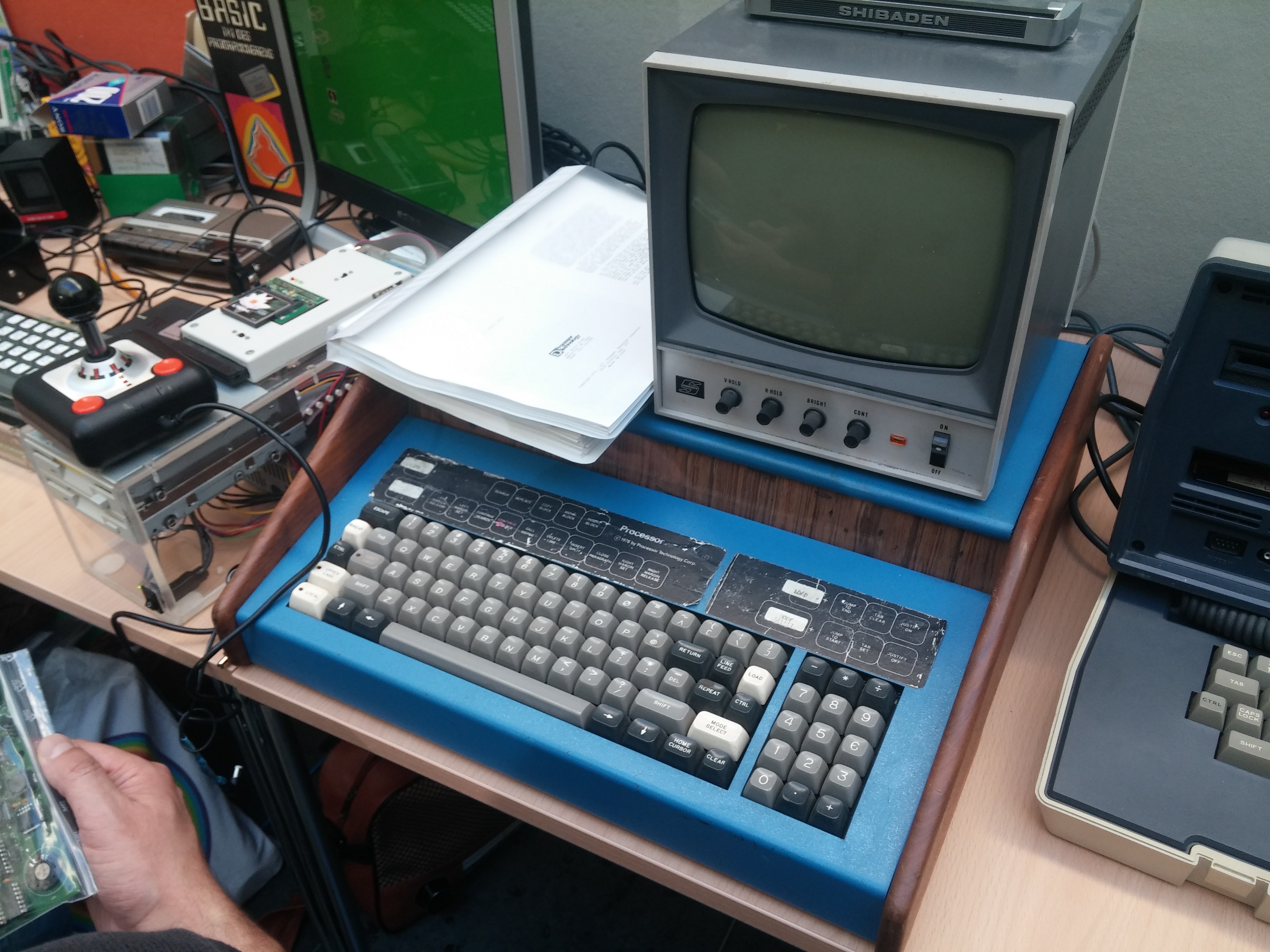
A Sol-20 with monitor

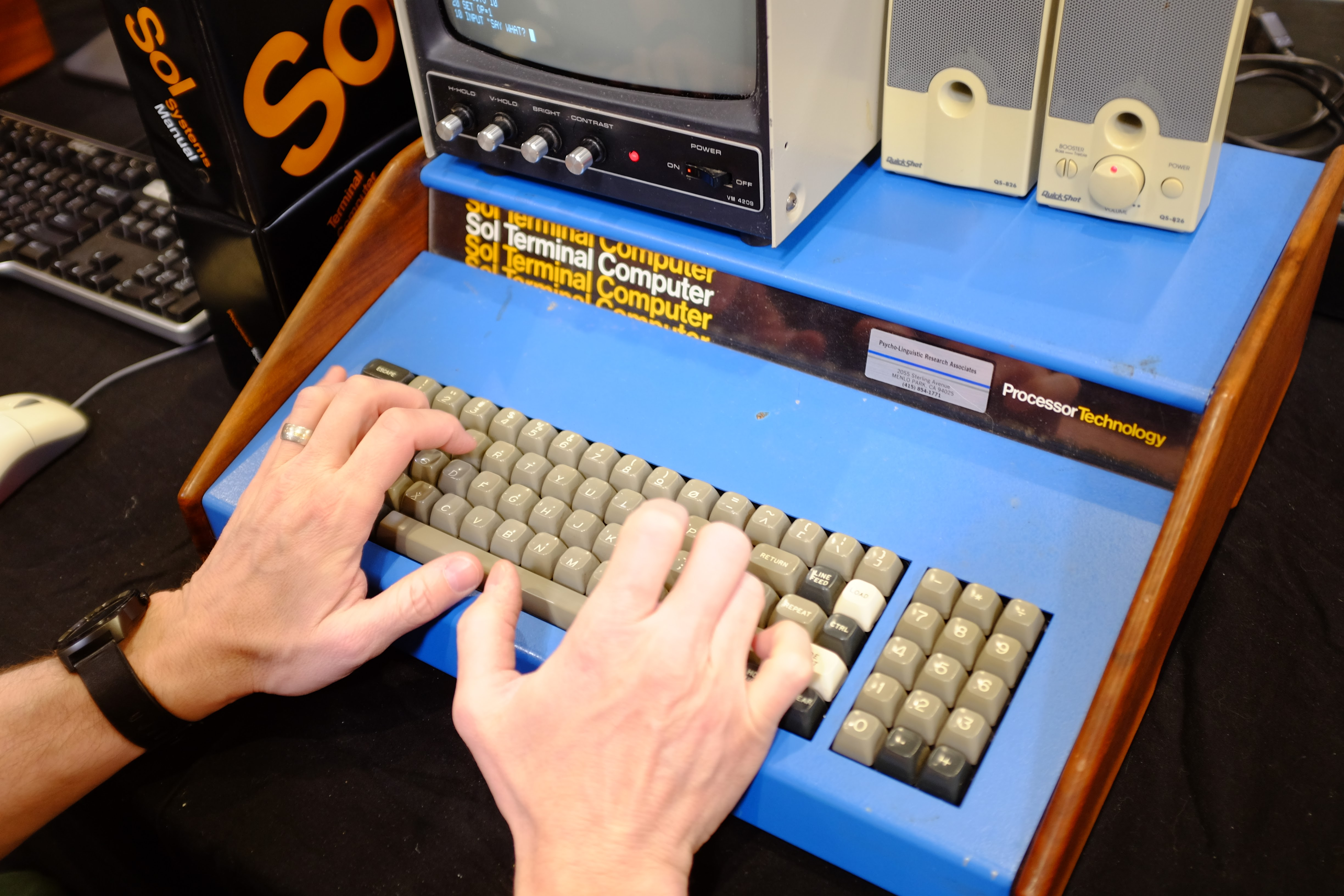
Typing a BASIC program into the Sol-20

The Sol-20 was among the first fully assembled microcomputers with a built-in keyboard and television output, (Note: In this, it was predated by perhaps only the Sphere 1. Earlier machines like the Micral N or Altair 8800 required a separate terminal for interactive use. The Sol-20 required only a television for output; everything else needed was built in.) what would later be known as a home computer. The design was the integration of an Intel 8080-based motherboard, a VDM-1 graphics card, the 3P+S I/O card to interface with the keyboard, and the CUTS card (Cassette Users Tape System) circuitry to connect to a cassette deck for program storage. Additional expansion was available via five S-100 bus slots inside the machine. It also included swappable ROMs that the manufacturer called 'personality modules', containing a rudimentary operating system.

The design was originally suggested by Les Solomon, the editor of Popular Electronics. He asked Bob Marsh of Processor Technology if he could design a smart terminal for use with the Altair 8800. Lee Felsenstein, who shared a garage working space with Marsh, had previously designed such a terminal but never built it. Reconsidering the design using modern electronics, they agreed the best solution was to build a complete computer with a terminal program in ROM. Felsenstein has stated that the name of the Sol was inspired after Les Solomon, Technical Editor of Popular Electronics.

The Sol appeared on the cover of the July 1976 issue of Popular Electronics as a "high-quality intelligent terminal". It was initially offered in three versions; the Sol-PC motherboard in kit form, the Sol-10 without expansion slots, and the Sol-20 with five slots.

A Sol-20 was taken to the Personal Computing Show in Atlantic City in August 1976 where it was a hit, building an order backlog that took a year to fill. Systems began shipping late that year and were dominated by the expandable Sol-20, which sold for $1,495 in its most basic fully-assembled form. The company also offered schematics for the system for free for those interested in building their own.

The Sol-20 remained in production until 1979, by which point about 12,000 machines (Note: Some sources put it at 5,000 kits and 5,000 assembled machines, but Felsenstein puts it at 12,000 total.) had been sold. By that time, the "1977 trinity" —the Apple II, Commodore PET and TRS-80— had begun to take over the market, and a series of failed new product introductions drove Processor Technology into bankruptcy. Felsenstein later developed the successful Osborne 1 computer, using much the same underlying design in a portable format.

== History ==
=== Tom Swift Terminal ===
Lee Felsenstein was one of the sysops of Community Memory, the first public bulletin board system. Community Memory opened in 1973, running on a SDS 940 mainframe that was accessed through a Teletype Model 33, essentially a computer printer and keyboard (a hard copy terminal that prints both input and output), in Leopold's Records record store in Berkeley, California. The cost of running the system was untenable; the teletype normally cost $1,500 (their first example was donated from Tymshare as junk), the modem another $300, and time on the SDS was expensive – in 1968, Tymshare charged $13 per hour (equivalent to $120 in 2025). Even the reams of paper output from the terminal were too expensive to be practical and the system jammed all the time. The replacement of the Model 33 with a Hazeltine glass terminal helped, but it required constant repairs. (Note: Hackers states it was a Hazeltine 1500, but that is not possible, the 1500 was not introduced until 1977. This is almost certainly the similar, but more expensive, Hazeltine 2000, which was released in late 1970.)

Since 1973, Felsenstein had been looking for ways to lower the cost. One of his earliest designs in the computer field was the Pennywhistle modem, a 300 bits per second acoustic coupler that was 1/3 the cost of commercial models. When he saw Don Lancaster's TV Typewriter on the cover of the September 1973 Radio Electronics, he began adapting its circuitry as the basis for a design he called the Tom Swift Terminal, a reference to the fictional scientist and inventor of the same name. The terminal was deliberately designed to allow it to be easily repaired. Combined with the Pennywhistle, users would have a cost-effective way to access Community Memory. Marsh and Felsenstein reconnected once Marsh finished building his TV Typewriter in 1974. When Felsenstein saw it, he began to design his own terminal, which he hoped to deploy as a replacement for Community Memory teletypes.

In January 1975, Felsenstein saw a post on Community Memory by Bob Marsh asking if anyone would like to share a garage. (Note: There are minor variations on the theme; in his 2008 interviews, Felsenstein suggests this took place in 1974.) Marsh was designing a fancy wood-cased digital clock and needed space to work on it. (Note: Marsh ultimately gave up on the clock design.) Felsenstein had previously met Marsh at school and agreed to split the $175 rent on a garage in Berkeley. Shortly after, Community Memory shut down for the last time, having burned out the relationship with its primary funding source, Project One, as well the energy of its founding members.

=== Processor Technology ===
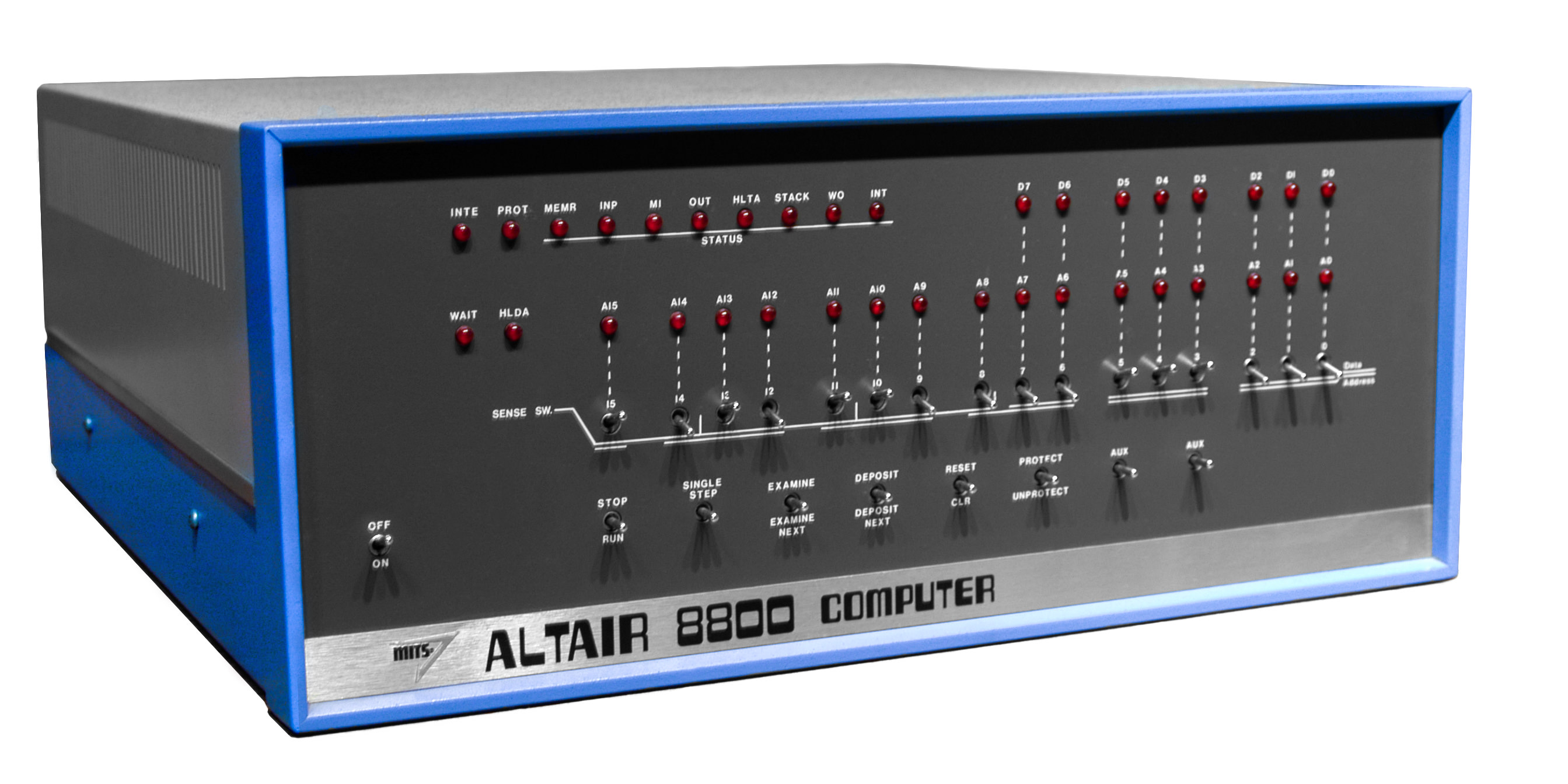
As supplied, the Altair 8800 could only be programmed via front-panel switches and lights. A cost-effective terminal was lacking.

January 1975 was also the month that the Altair 8800 appeared on the front page of Popular Electronics, sparking off intense interest among the engineers of the rapidly growing Silicon Valley. Shortly thereafter, on 5 March 1975, Gordon French and Fred Moore held the first meeting of what would become the Homebrew Computer Club. Felsenstein took Marsh to one of the meetings, (Note: Here too the stories vary somewhat; Felsenstein's 2008 interviews state they went to the first meeting together, while his 1977 article states he did not attend until the second meeting in March. However, the first meeting of the club was in March, the second in April.) Marsh saw an opportunity supplying add-on cards for the Altair, and in April, he formed Processor Technology with his friend Gary Ingram. The company proposed their own 8080 board to effectively create the new computer. But, Felsenstein declined the offer to design it, and the project was scrapped.

The new company's first product was a 4 kB DRAM memory card for the Altair. A similar card was already available from the Altair's designers, MITS, but it was almost impossible to get working properly. Marsh began offering Felsenstein contracts to draw schematics or write manuals for the products they planned to introduce. Felsenstein was still working on the terminal as well, and in July, Marsh offered to pay him to develop the video portion. This was essentially a version of the terminal where the data would be supplied by the main memory of the Altair rather than a serial port.

The result was the VDM-1, the first graphics card. The VDM-1 could display 16 lines of 64 characters per line, (Note: 16 × 64 = 1,024, the number of bits in a 1 kB SRAM.) and included the complete ASCII character set with upper- and lower-case characters and a number of graphics characters like arrows and basic math symbols. The VDM-1 freed thousands of hobbyists from the noise, expense, and maintenance requirements of a teletype, or the cost and extra space required for a proper terminal. An Altair equipped with a VDM-1 for output and Processor Technology's 3P+S card running a keyboard for input removed the need for a terminal, yet cost less than dedicated smart terminals like the Hazeltine. (Note: According to Anderson, the VDM-1 was $199, and monitors were available "for $150 or so." In contrast, the Hazeltine 2000 terminal sold for $2,995, and the "low-cost" 1500 series, introduced in 1977, started at $1,125.)

=== Intelligent terminal concept ===
Before the VDM-1 was launched in the fall of 1975, the only way to program the Altair was through its front-panel switches and LED lamps, or by purchasing a serial card and using a terminal of some sort. This was typically a Teletype Model 33, which still cost $1,500 if available. Normally the teletypes were not available – Teletype Corporation typically sold them only to large commercial customers, which led to a thriving market for broken-down machines that could be repaired and sold into the microcomputer market. Ed Roberts, who had developed the Altair, eventually arranged a deal with Teletype to supply refurbished Model 33s to MITS customers who had bought an Altair.

Les Solomon, whose Popular Electronics magazine launched the Altair, felt a low-cost smart terminal would be highly desirable in the rapidly expanding microcomputer market. In December 1975, Solomon traveled to Phoenix to meet with Don Lancaster to ask about using his TV Typewriter as a video display in a terminal. Lancaster seemed interested, so Solomon took him to Albuquerque to meet Roberts. The two immediately began arguing when Lancaster criticized the design of the Altair and suggested changes to better support expansion cards, demands that Roberts flatly refused. Any hopes of a partnership disappeared.

Solomon then traveled to California and approached Marsh with the same idea, stating that if they could produce the design within 30 days, he would put it on the cover of the magazine. Marsh once again hired Felsenstein to design the system. As Felsenstein later noted:

In the process leading to the birth of the Sol, Leslie Solomon performed the act of the male. I still don't know who solicited whom.

=== Design effort ===
Felsenstein initially wanted to build a terminal following the model of his earlier Tom Swift design, using discrete electronics. Marsh, in parallel, sketched out a version using the Intel 8080 in April 1976, in which the terminal was titled the "Sol-1" at the time. The new machine was meant to maintain compatibility with the Altair 8800 and the S-100 bus. It quickly became apparent the difference in cost would only be about $10, and from then on the original dedicated terminal concept was dropped. Over time the plans changed, and at some point, Marsh told Felsenstein "We want you to design a computer around the VDM display."

Initially, the idea was to sell a kit system, as was common in the industry at that time. The kit concept would make it through to the release, at which time it was known as the Sol-PC. As the design process continued, at some point the decision was made to offer the system in complete form, with all the parts needed for a complete system. (Note: Depending on the way you read the words in his oral history, Felsenstein suggests this may have been the idea all along.)

Felsenstein originally thought he was only needed for the initial design, but as the physical layout began it was clear that the layout artist they had hired would not be able to do it on his own. Marsh had a woodworker friend build a large light table and Felsenstein and the layout artist began using it to design the printed circuit board for the motherboard. While Felsenstein worked on the design, Marsh continually came up with new ideas that he demanded to be included. This led to creeping featuritis problems and the final design was not delivered until about two months of "frantic" work.

The final product consisted of a single motherboard with the 8080, a simplified version of the VDM-1, serial input/output, and 1k of SRAM for the screen buffer. A ROM, the "personality module", would include the terminal driver or other code which would begin running as soon as the machine was turned on. The module was designed so it could be removed or inserted without accessing the interior of the machine.

Marsh, meanwhile, was working on the physical design. He demanded from the start that it use walnut sides; while working on the digital clock project he had learned from his woodworker friend that they could get parts for practically nothing if they were small enough to be made from off-cuts. Beyond that requirement, anything was fair. The deadline for the magazine had been pushed back, but there was still little time to finalize the layout before it needed to be photographed. Marsh decided that the machine should have a cassette deck, so they mocked up a machine with a keyboard on the left and cassette player on the right.

The first motherboard arrived 45 days after the project started, and the first cases and power supplies about 15 days after that. By this point it was clear the system was a usable microcomputer on its own, but "the decision was made to soft-pedal the fact until the last possible moment. Once published, all the fuss possible was to be made about its general-purpose nature; but until it actually saw print, it was to be treated first as a terminal."

As the machine increasingly expanded in power, Felsenstein suggested the name "Sol", because they were including "the wisdom of Solomon" in the system. Les Solomon would later quip that "if it worked, they'll say Sol means 'sun' in Spanish. If it don't work, they're gonna blame it on the Jewish guys." Stan Veit later joked to Solomon that they named it after him in another way, "the LES Intelligent Terminal".

=== Release ===
The original mock-up of the Sol shows a slimmer case and a cassette deck where the numeric keypad would ultimately be placed.

In February 1976, the first machine, a kludged-up box of parts, was readied and flown to New York to show Solomon. As he pointed out the features, Solomon asked what was stopping anyone from putting a BASIC on the personality ROM. Felsenstein, who had been told to avoid referring to it as a computer, simply replied "beats me". When they powered it up the machine would not work, displaying unreadably fuzzy images. Marsh and Felsenstein then flew to Boston to visit the offices of the newly started Byte magazine. While there, Felsenstein had time to discover the problem was a tiny bit of broken wire that got stuck under a chip, shorting out two of the video lines. They returned to Solomon's house to demonstrate the working unit.

Due to publication timelines, it did not appear in the magazine until the July 1976 issue, where it was described as "high-quality intelligent terminal". The cover image showed the mockup version, packaged in a slim case. By the time the article appeared, the design had changed; the new design had a distinct "step" behind the keyboard that rose up over the expansion chassis and power supply at the back of the case. A bent piece of sheet steel formed most of the case, capped on the left and right by the wooden panels Marsh demanded.

The new design was first shown at the Midwest Area Computer Club conference in June 1976. The machine was not ready for sales at this point, but they did a brisk business selling their existing expansion card line. This was followed by the Personal Computing '76 (PC'76) show in late August in the dilapidated Shelburne Hotel in Atlantic City. The order book was officially opened and Sol was a huge hit at this show.

Soon after, Marsh was invited to demonstrate the Sol on NBC's The Tomorrow Show. They used a game by Steve Dompier called "Target" to show off the system's capabilities. The show's host, Tom Snyder, ended up playing the game right through the commercial breaks, and they had to force him to give up the machine in order to finish the show.

=== Sales ===
The Sol was initially offered in three versions. The base motherboard was offered as the Sol-PC, available as a kit for $575, or fully assembled and tested for $745. The Sol-10 added a case, keyboard and power supply, and sold for $895 in kit form and $1,295 assembled. Finally the Sol-20 added a keyboard with numeric keypad, and a larger power supply to feed the five expansion slots and a fan to cool them, for $995 as a kit or $1,495 assembled. Advertising of the time referred to the Sol-20 as "The first complete small computer under $1,000". Most systems would require additional pieces, which they bundled as the "Sol Systems"; the Sol System I consisted of a Sol-20, an 8k RAM card, a PT-872 monitor and the RQ-413 Cassette Recorder, for $2,129.

In keeping with the hacker ethic, the company also offered to send out copies of the schematic for the motherboard for the cost of postage, later estimating that somewhere between 40,000 and 50,000 copies were sent. Few, if any, Sol-10s were sold, (Note: As Felsenstein later put it, "Nobody ever bought one".) and the company focused on the Sol-20. The first machines shipped in December 1976. These were also available for third-party sales, and this began the formation of a dealer network among some of the earliest computer stores. By 1977, Processor Technology had a reputation for quality and was among the best-selling computers in the world.

By this time, S-100 machines were beginning to make inroads into business markets. Processor Technology invited all of their dealers to a meeting in Emeryville, California, outside Berkeley, to introduce their Helios floppy disk drive for $1,199, along with their PTDOS system to work with it. They also promised larger memory cards and a color video card. Additionally, dealers could now order 30 days net, as opposed to cash-on-delivery, although to do so they had to put in orders at least once a quarter.

=== Collapse ===
These plans quickly fell apart. The Helios was initially based on a new mechanism from Diablo Data Systems. Diablo had been purchased by Xerox in 1972, and shortly after the Helios was announced, Xerox canceled development of the floppy line. Processor Technology selected the new Persci 270 in its place. The 270 had two drive bays operated by a single drive and voice coil head positioner, which meant a two-drive system was only slightly more complex than a single drive. This was released as the Helios II, at $1,895 for the kit or $2,295 assembled. Processor Technology moved to a much larger factory in Pleasanton, California.

It was at about this point that Radio Shack introduced the TRS-80. Like the Sol, it was a complete all-in-one machine but came with its own monitor and sold for about half the price. Moreover, it was available at hundreds of Radio Shack stores across North America. Sales of the Sol plummeted. Meanwhile, the company failed to introduce any of the other new products it mentioned, notably the color graphics card. When the Apple II appeared with color graphics, it quickly became a best seller.

To add to their woes, Processor Technology had contracted North Star Computers to write a new version of the BASIC for the Sol machines. North Star then began selling the resulting North Star BASIC to other vendors as well. Processor Technology sued North Star, claiming the contract had been exclusive. The suit dragged on, hurting both companies before Processor Technology ultimately lost. To add to the injury, North Star then released a new 5.25-inch drive for the system that sold at half the cost of the Helios. A patch that allowed CP/M to run on the new drives killed off any interest in alternatives like PTDOS, and new business applications like WordStar and Electric Pencil soon cemented CP/M as the standard operating system for all S-100 machines.

Processor Technology continued selling the Helios system and refused to consider replacing PTDOS with CP/M. Helios proved to be highly unreliable and resulted in a lawsuit by those owners that had purchased them. Meanwhile, the company introduced one of its few new products during this period, 32 and 64 kB memory cards based on dynamic RAM which was much denser than the older SRAMs. These began failing at an alarming rate, overwhelming the company's ability to repair them.

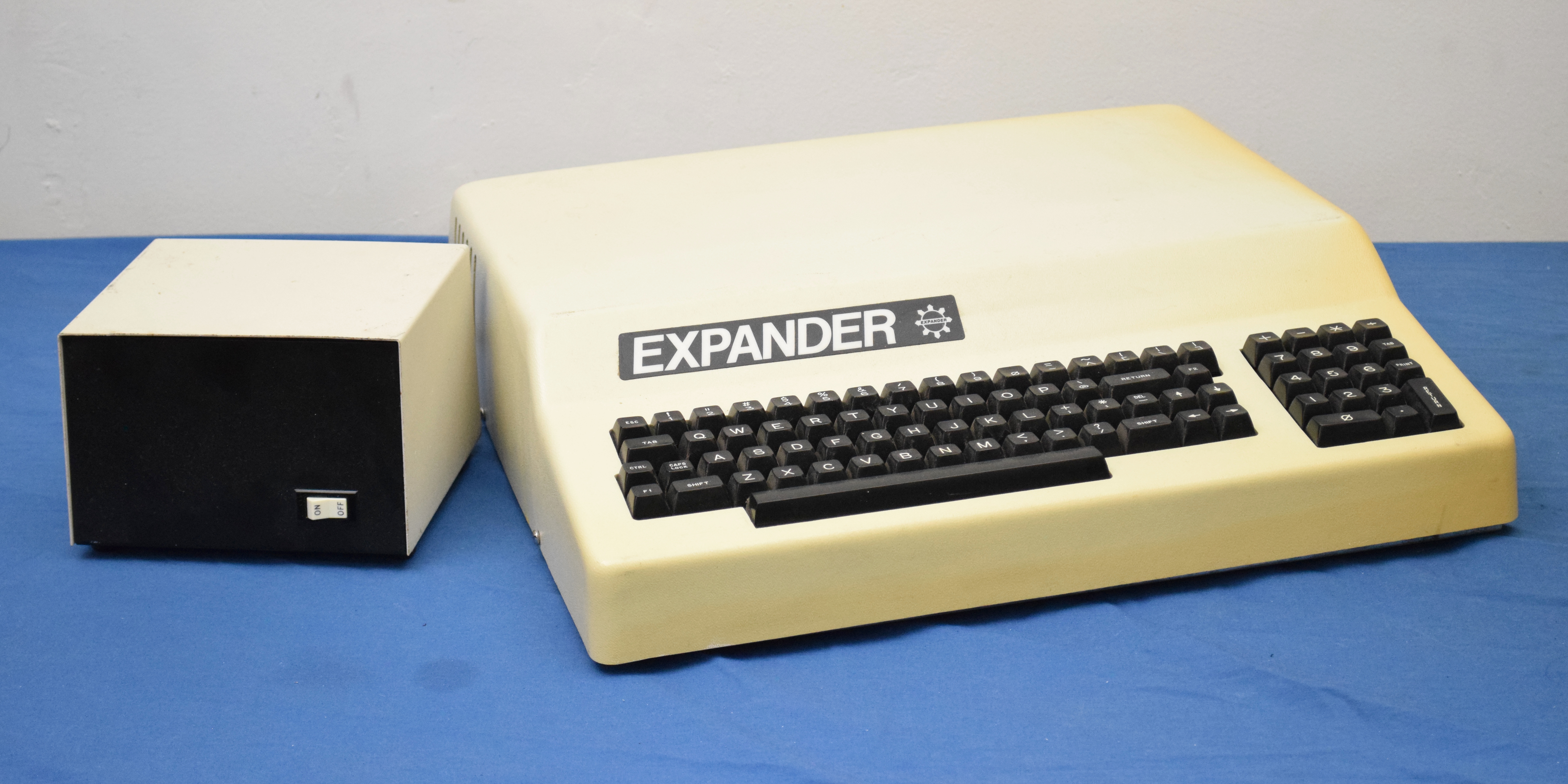
The Micro Expander microcomputer, designed by Felsenstein and released in 1981, is seen as the Sol-20's spiritual successor.

These problems caused the company to go bankrupt, and the company was eventually liquidated on 14 May 1979. Talks of producing a successor to the Sol-20 between Felsenstein and a group of investors including Adam Osborne fell through after Felsenstein enumerated all the improvements that would need to be made to make it competitive in the burgeoning early 1980s home computer market. However, in 1980, he collaborated with a Swedish businessman named Mats Ingemanson and brought to market the Micro Expander, seen as the spiritual successor to the Sol-20.

== Description ==
From the Sol Systems Manual unless otherwise noted.

=== Physical layout ===
A Sol-20 with the rear cover removed.

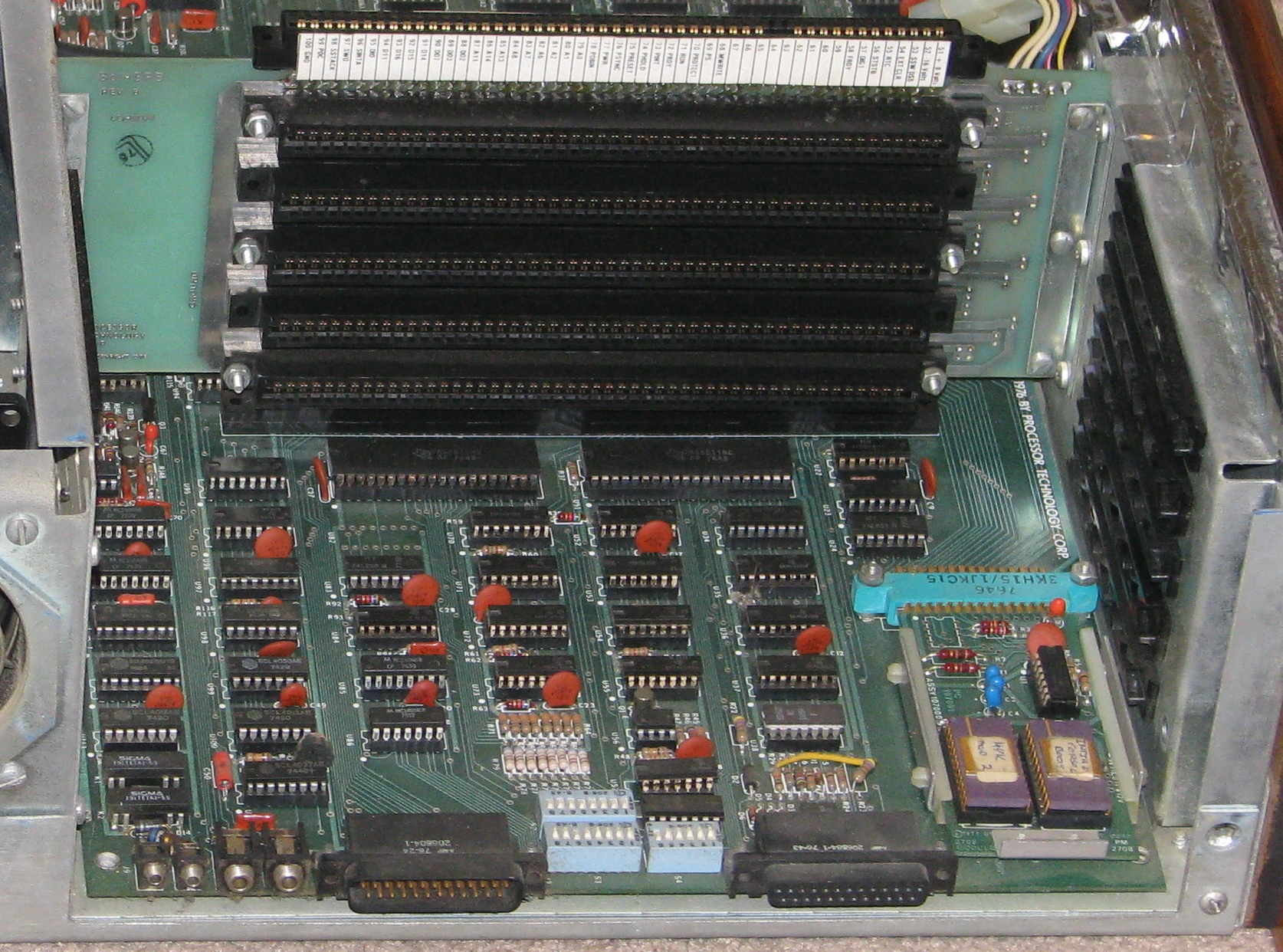
Sol-20 motherboard. Note the expansion chassis in the center, and the Personality Module ROM cartridge on the extreme right. The Module can be removed by pulling on the L-shaped metal bracket.

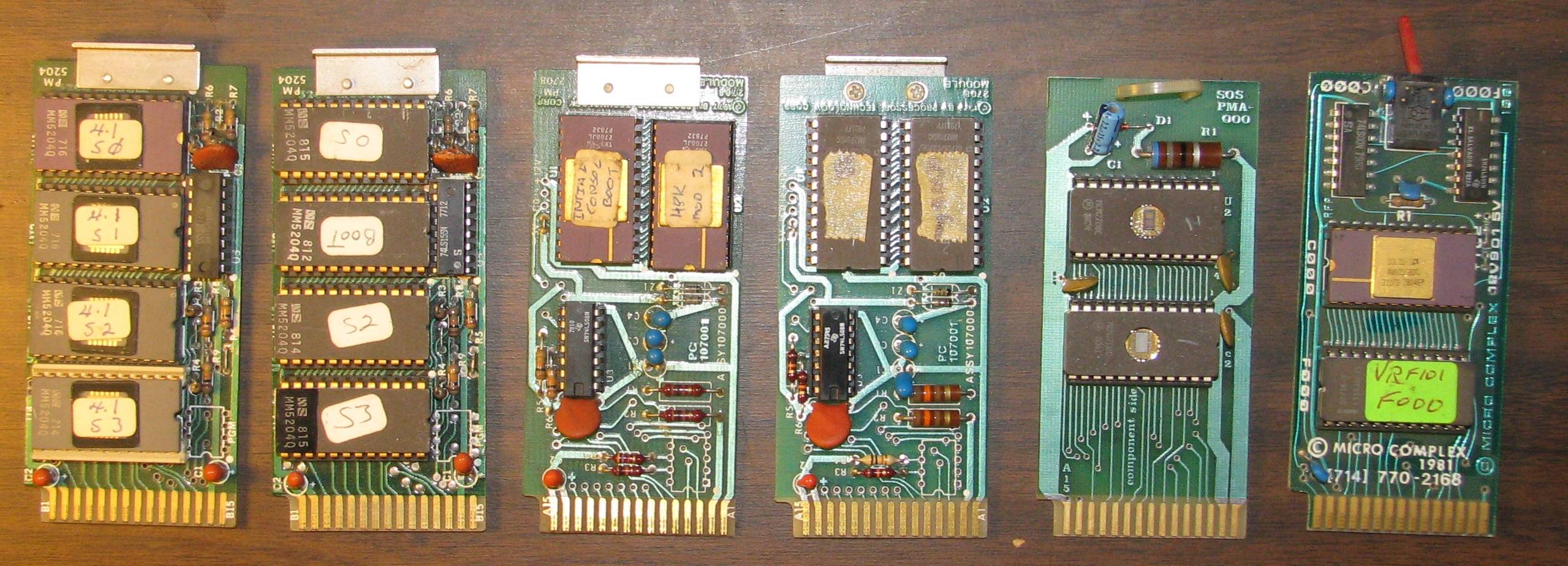
Two PM-5204, two PM-2708, one Golemics, and one Micro Complex dual personality modules for Sol-20

Looking at the Sol-20 from the front, where the operator would sit, the keyboard was in a typical location with the main QWERTY-style layout on the left and the numeric keypad on the right. The wooden sides of the case were close on either side of the keyboard, potentially interfering with the operator's hands.

On the rear right of the case (as seen from the front), directly to the rear of the numeric keypad, was the power supply, which also provided a fan to cool the circuitry. The main motherboard sat to the left of the power supply, spanning about two-thirds of the case's width. The motherboard extended forward under the keyboard all the way to the front of the case.

Cassette, parallel and serial ports extended off the back of the motherboard into holes in the case. Directly below the fan, was a UHF connector that produced composite video output. This could be connected to a monitor, or with a bit of work, a conventional television. The processor was near the back of the machine, with the memory and video circuits at the front. This required the video output to be routed to the back of the machine with a coaxial cable running across the top of the card.

=== Sol bus ===
Originally, expansion was going to be handled through an external cage that connected to the main console using two 50-pin ribbon cables. The original Altair bus design lacked signal ground pins for each of its data lines, a decision that had been made in order to reduce pin count and allow it to fit into 100-pin connectors they found in surplus. This led to noisy signals as they all shared a common ground, a topic of considerable derision by many users. When the bus was extended into a ribbon cable, the resulting signals were too noisy to be useful, and Marsh demanded that there be additional ground pins spread across the cable to reduce this noise.

The Sol solved this problem by supporting only one of the two data busses at a time, allowing input or output and switching between them by signaling with the DBIN pin on the 8080. Since only one bus was being used at a time, they could share a set of eight pins, which allowed the eight formerly dedicated to the second bus to be used as ground lines instead. Ultimately, the idea of using an external chassis was dropped. By this time the decision to use the additional lines for grounds had been made, which had the desirable side-effect of making the board easier to design.

The same 50-pin concept was instead implemented in an internal expansion chassis, the Sol-BPB. This extended vertically upwards from roughly the center of the motherboard. It had five horizontal connectors, and a metal framework on either side mechanically supported the expansion cards. The Sol-BPB also had another edge connector at the top, and while it's doubtful that this could be used for further expansion, it was definitely useful as an extender, granting access to both sides of an S-100 board for troubleshooting. The BPB retained the DBIN signaling and ground pins of the early design and this quickly became a de facto standard for S-100 cards.

This change to the bus design was contentious, as it meant cards for the Altair did not work in the Sol without some adjustments. Felsenstein noted, "I take the position that Bob made me do it, and he takes the position that history will absolve him."

=== Software ===
Three "personality modules" were released with the original systems. CONSOL provided a simple terminal emulator function, along with a small number of additional commands to load and run programs from tape using TLOAD. SOLOS added names to the files on the cassette, the TSAVE command for saving data to the tape into a named file, and TCAT to print out the details of a named program. TXEC loaded and executed a named program in one step. SOLED included block-mode editing, used on some mainframe systems, but it is not clear if this was actually available.

One commonly used software for the Sol-20 was the BASIC/5 language. This was able to run in even a minimal machine with a 4 KB expansion, but in order to fit it had only single-precision floating point numbers and lacked string variables. An Extended BASIC that ran in 8 KB added strings and other functions. Processor Technology also sold a wide variety of other programs, including many games, on cassette format for the Sol, or on punch tape for other S-100 machines.

There are 21 known commercial games or game compilations for the SOL-20

Title	Year	Publisher
8080 Chess	1977	Processor Technology Corp.
Air Traffic Control	1978	Creative Computing Software
Drag	1977	MECC Minnesota Educational Computing Corp.
Fastgammon	1979	Quality Soft. Reseda, CA, USA
French Fur Trader	1977	MECC Minnesota Educational Computing Corp.
GAMEPAC 1	1977	Processor Technology Corp.
GAMEPAC 2	1978	Processor Technology Corp.
Gunner	1978	MECC Minnesota Educational Computing Corp.
Lunar Lander	1976	Processor Technology Corp.
Matches	1977	Processor Technology Corp.
Microchess	1977	Micro-Ware, Ltd.
Newtrek	1977	MECC Minnesota Educational Computing Corp.
Race Car Driving Simulation	1977	MECC Minnesota Educational Computing Corp.
Radar	1978	MECC Minnesota Educational Computing Corp.
Space Games - 4 (Asteroid, Lunar Lander, Romulan, Star Wars)	1978	Creative Computing Software
Strategy Games - 2 (Trap, Race, Wumpus I, Wumpus II, Kingdom)	1978	Creative Computing Software
Strwar P	1978	MECC Minnesota Educational Computing Corp.
The OZNAKI Life	1978	People's Computer Co.
Trek 80	1977	Processor Technology Corp.
Vegas	1978	MECC Minnesota Educational Computing Corp.
W.W.III	1978	MECC Minnesota Educational Computing Corp.
