= Micro Expander =

1981 microcomputer

Micro Expander Model 1

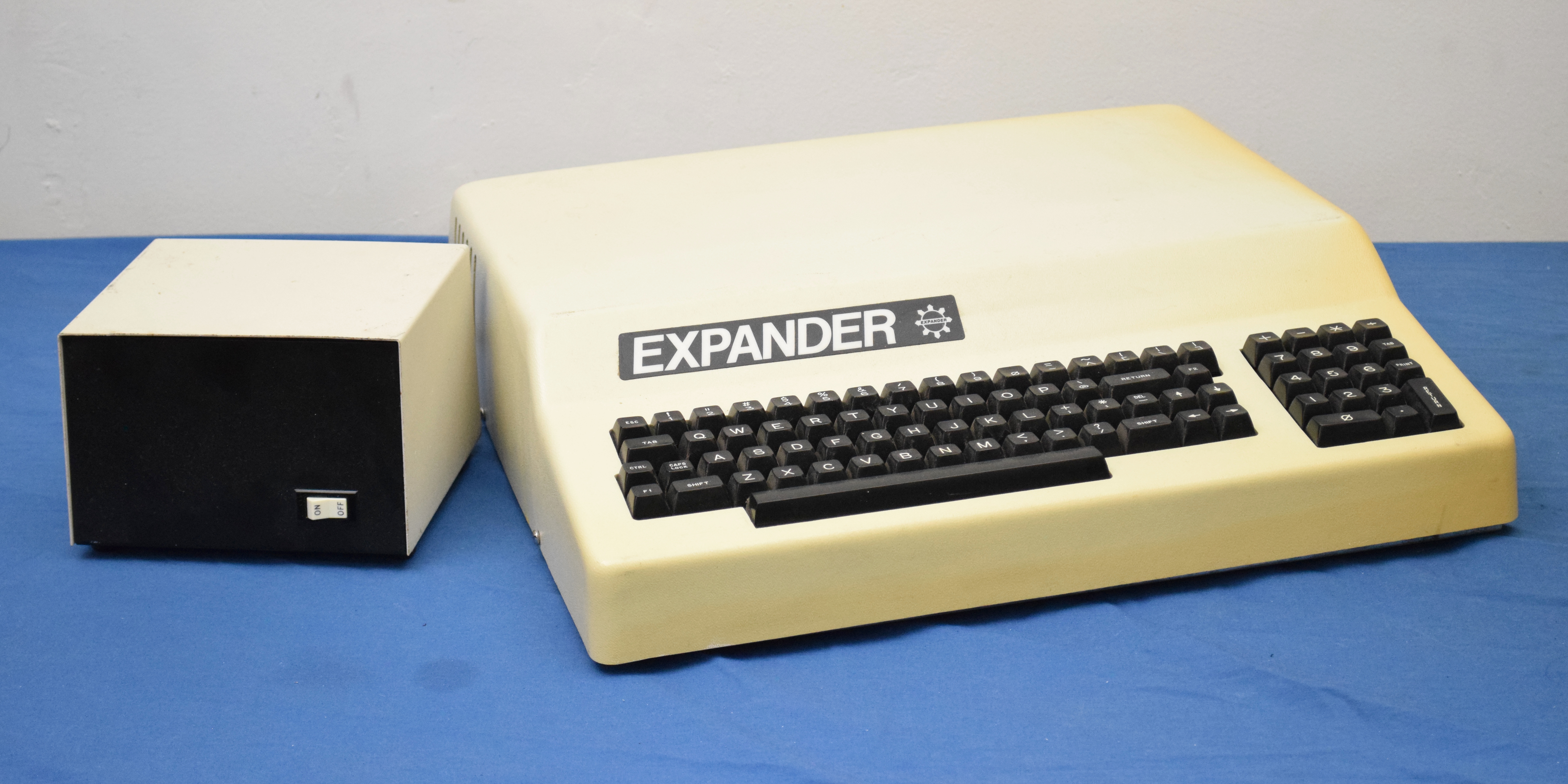
- Developer: Lee Felsenstein
- Manufacturer: Micro-Expander, Inc.
- Type: Microcomputer
- Released: May 1981; 45 years ago
- CPU: Zilog Z80A at 3.58 MHz
- Memory: 64 KB of RAM stock (expandable to up to 512 KB)
- Display: NTSC output Monochrome: 80 × 24 characters, 160 × 72 pixels 256 colors: 40 × 24 characters, 80 × 72 pixels
- Predecessor: Sol-20

The Micro Expander Model 1 (also known simply as the Expander and sold in Europe as the PAL) is an S-100-based microcomputer introduced by Micro-Expander, Inc., in 1981. The computer was the brainchild of Lee Felsenstein, designer of the Sol-20, the first home computer. After his primary client and marketers of the Sol-20, Processor Technology, went out of business in 1979, Felsenstein founded a new company, Micro-Expander, Inc., in 1980. He gained the capital to sell his prototype of a successor to the Sol-20 as the Micro Expander Model 1 with help from some Swedish investors, primarily Mats Ingemanson, who was hired to market the computer.

== Specifications ==
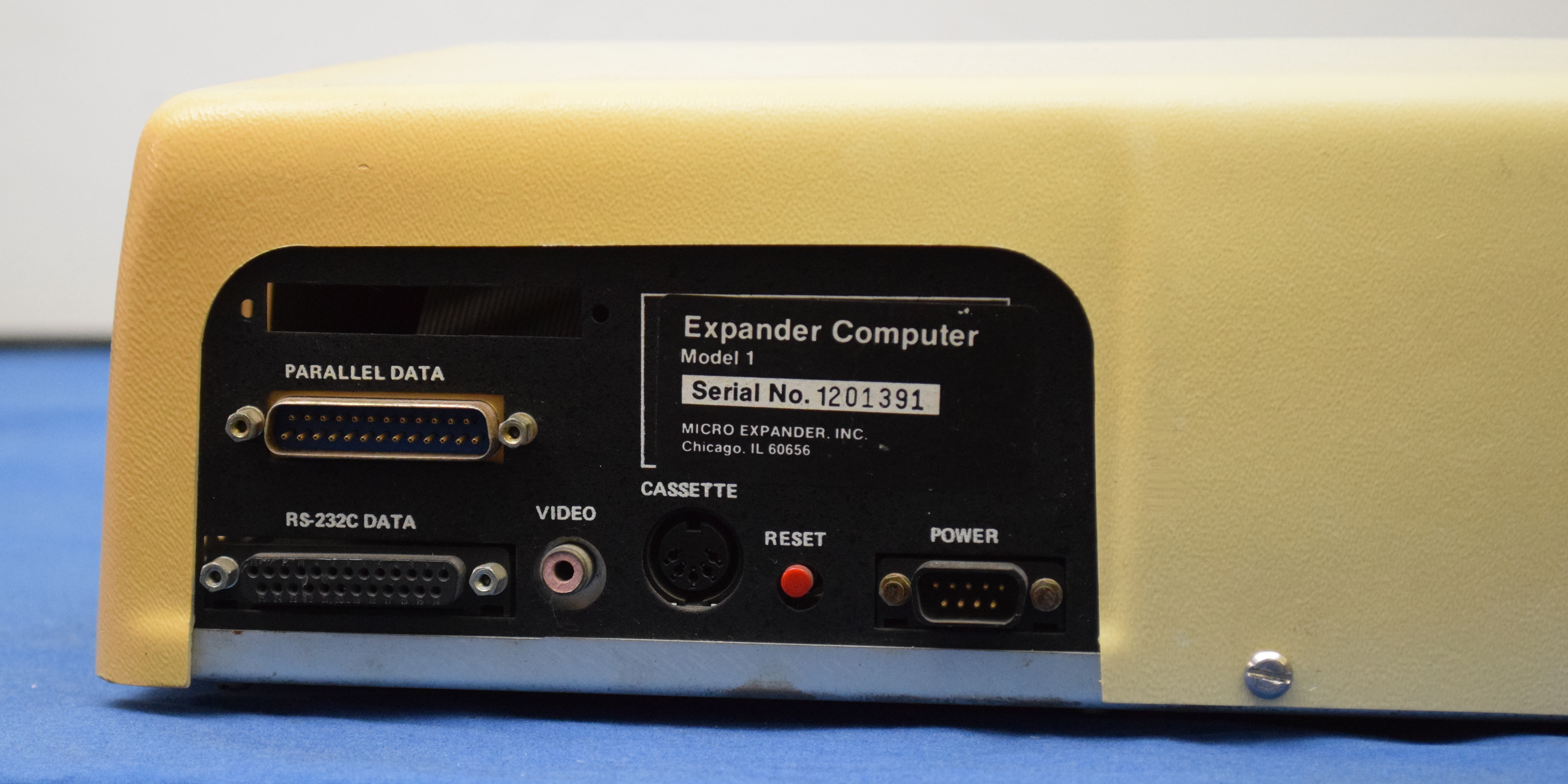
Rear connectors and data plate

The Micro Expander Model 1 is a microcomputer with a built-in, full-sized keyboard complete with a numeric keypad, two programmable function keys, and four cursor keys. The Expander measures 18 by 18 by 3.5 inches (45.7 by 45.7 by 8.9 cm) and features a form factor identical to the Sol-20, but without the walnut side panels. The Expander is built on a single printed circuit board which includes the microprocessor, ROM, the interrupt controller (which handles up to five simultaneous interrupt requests), the keyboard controller, an RS-232 serial I/O controller, a parallel interface controller, and circuitry to drive monochrome and color displays. The mainboard also contains a real-time clock, a polyphonic sound chip and internal beeper speaker, and a cassette interface controller compatible with that of Radio Shack's TRS-80 line of microcomputers.

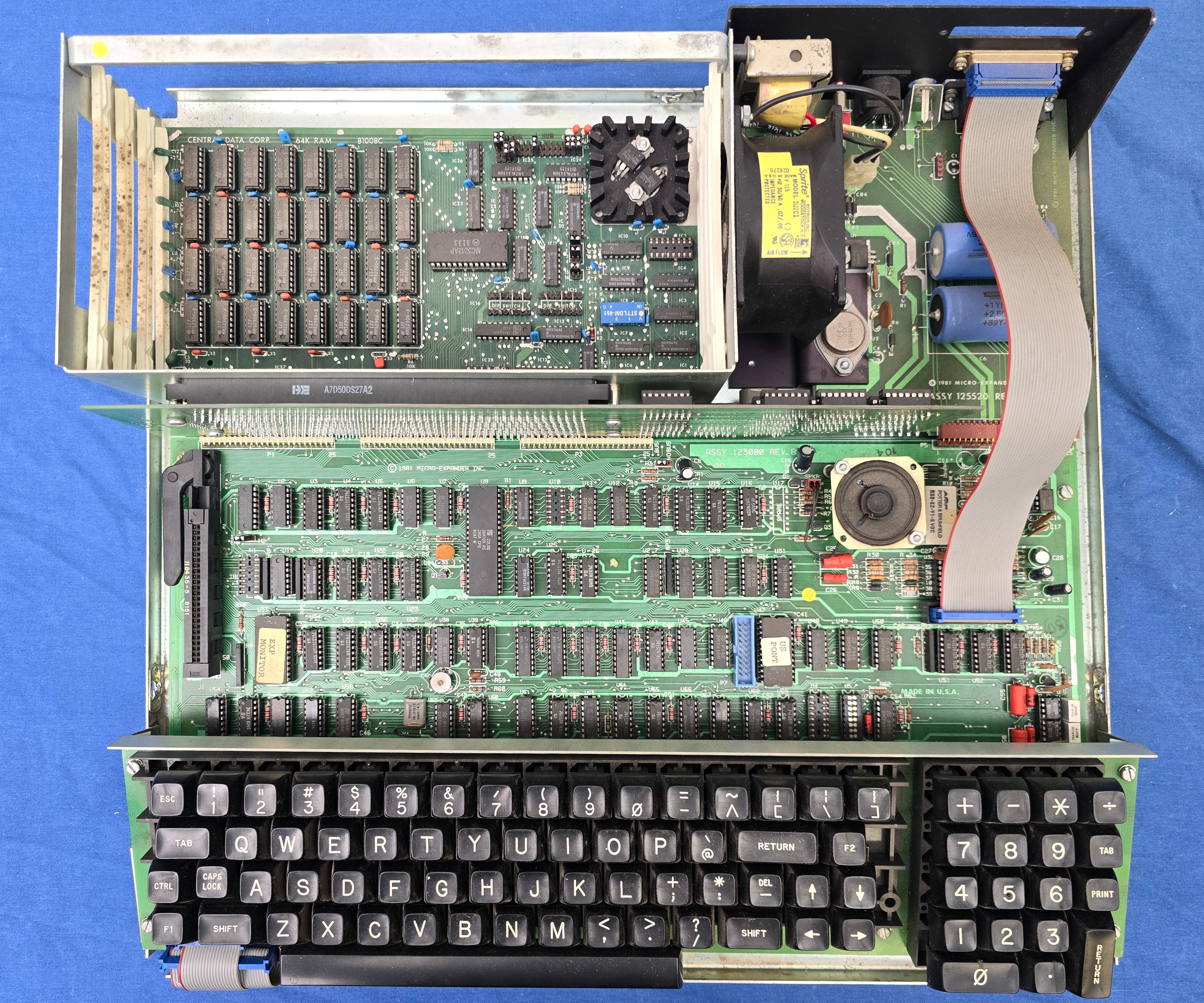
Top cover off, exposing the mainboard with a Zilog Z80, PSU, and a 64K RAM board installed in one of the S-100 expansion slots

The Expander runs off a Zilog Z80A microprocessor clocked at 3.58 MHz and features 64 KB of RAM stock, expandable to up to 512 KB. Like the Sol-20, the Expander features the once-ubiquitous S-100 bus, with four S-100 expansion slots on the back of the machine, allowing a wide range of expansion cards for various applications (such as computer graphics, secretarial work, and process control) to be installed into it. As stock, one of the four expansion cards is occupied by a 64-KB RAM card. Cards are allowed to be piggybacked onto one another owing to added internal bus structures, potentially allowing more than four expansion cards to be installed at once.

The Expander could run any standalone software, programming language interpreter, and operating system written for the Z80. CP/M and MP/M were the most common operating systems for Z80 machines at the time of its release. Micro Expander shipped the computer with a copy Microsoft's 24-KB BASIC interpreter on 5.25-inch floppy disk as well as a copy of their 10-KB cassette BASIC interpreter on microcassette. A 4-KB machine code monitor is also included on a ROM on the mainboard.

The Expander can generate video in one of four modes: monochrome text, monochrome graphics, color text, and color graphics. In monochrome text mode it can display 80 columns by 24 lines of text; its character generation chip supports both uppercase and lowercase text. In monochrome graphics mode it can display one screen of 160 by 72 pixels in either black or white. In color text mode it can display 40 columns by 24 lines of text, with each character cell able to have its background and text set to any of the 256 available colors. In color graphics mode, it can display one screen of 80 by 72 pixels, with 256 simultaneous colors available. By InfoWorld's estimation, the Expander was the first low-cost S-100 system to have built-in color graphics as a standard feature.

== Development and release ==
The Micro Expander was the brainchild of Lee Felsenstein, designer of the Sol-20, the first pre-assembled microcomputer with a built-in keyboard and external video output (in essence, the first home computer). Processor Technology, who manufactured and marketed the Sol-20, commissioned Felsenstein for the blueprints of a successor to their VDM-1, the first video card for the S-100 bus. Before the design was production-ready, however, Processor Technology abruptly went out of business in May 1979, leaving Felsenstein in a vulnerable position, having recently leased an 800-square-foot shop in Berkeley, California, and now lacking his biggest client and primary source of income. A businessman acting on behalf of a group of investors, including Adam Osborne, asked Felsenstein about developing a successor to the Sol-20 but was put off by Felsenstein's long list of improvements he deemed necessary to carry the Sol-20 design into the next decade. By way of Bill Etra, however, he soon met a Swedish businessman named Mats Ingemanson, who asked Felsenstein to design a computer similar to the Apple II but that was capable of running software for the Z80, including CP/M, and that could display graphics compatible with Radio Shack's TRS-80. The result of their collaboration was the Micro Expander Model I, first announced in September 1980 and unveiled at the West Coast Computer Faire in April 1981. According to Ingemanson, the Micro Expander was essentially "what the Sol would have become."

Felsenstein incorporated Micro-Expander, Inc., in Chicago, Illinois, to market the device in the United States and Europe. The company was financially backed by a number of investors in Sweden including Ingemanson, but the computer was manufactured in the United States, by Manu-Tronics of Kenosha, Wisconsin. Felsenstein hired Ingemanson as the head of marketing for Micro-Expander, Inc., while Bob Marsh of Processor Technology was hired as head of production. In Europe, the computer was sold as the PAL, named after the European analog color broadcasting encoding standard of the same name, PAL. Initially slated for a fourth-quarter 1980 release, the company finally released the Expander in May 1981, as the company's distribution network was not set up until earlier in April. Their original target street price for the Expander was $1,500 in 1980; this was later revised to just under $2,000 in 1981.

Despite including Microsoft BASIC on disk, the Micro Expander was released without any specific disk hardware developed for it. Ingemanson explained that such a disk system would eventually be released, although he expressed that the company was hesitant to disrupt the existing ecosystem of compatible S-100 floppy disk hardware.

The company projected sales of a few hundred units of the Expander between May and July 1981. Ingemanson was optimistic about selling thousands of units monthly by fall 1981. However, Felsenstein in 1996 estimated that only about 200 units of the Expander were ever produced. In a 2008 interview, Felsenstein recalled that production of the Micro Expander was marred by financial instability; following a failure to secure payment for the initial production run, Manu-Tronics attempted to liquidate the inventory of completed Micro Expanders independently with little success. He alleged that Ingemanson was "one of those examples of the virtual entrepreneur ... He had no organization at all and as it turns out, he couldn't pay for the production of the machines". With Adam Osborne and his Osborne Computer Corporation, Felsenstein designed the far more successful Osborne 1 in 1981.

Micro-Expander, Inc. later released a 16-bit upgrade board for the Expander in June 1982. According to a buyer's guide in one computer magazine, the Expander remained on sale into at least 1983. Micro-Expander, Inc., went defunct in January 1987.
