= Expander =

Expander may refer to:

- Dynamic range compression operated in reverse
- Part of the process of signal compression
- Part of the process of companding
- A component used to connect SCSI computer data storage, devices together
- Turboexpander, a turbine for high-pressure gas
- Expander graph, a sparse graph used in the combinatorics branch of mathematics
- StuffIt Expander, a computer file decompressor software utility
- Micro Expander, also known as the Expander, an 8-bit S-100 microcomputer released in 1981
- "Expander" (song), a 1994 song by The Future Sound of London
- Orthodontic expander, a device to widen the upper jaw
- Disclosure widget, a widget that hides non-essential settings or information, also known as an expander

== See also ==
- Xpander (disambiguation)
