= 3P+S =

The 3P+S Input/Output Module was an S-100 computer multifunction expansion card introduced to the microcomputer market by Processor Technology in 1976. The board supplied three parallel ports and one serial port, the latter of which conformed to the RS-232C serial communications standard. One of the three parallel ports was dedicated to interfacing with the host computer over the S-100 bus, while the other two were available for general use.

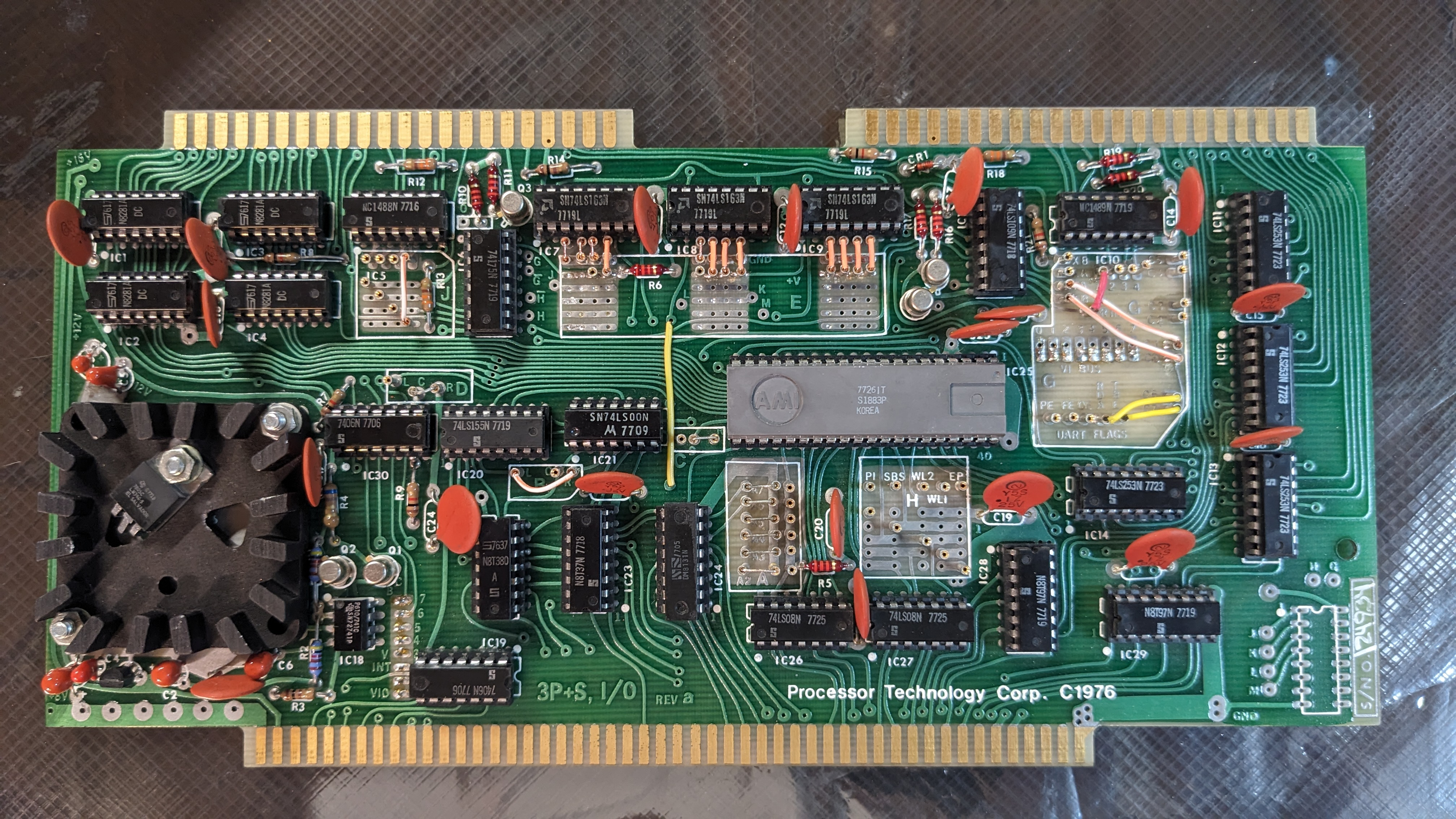
3P+S Board

An Altair 8800 equipped with a 3P+S could use one of the parallel ports to accept input from a keyboard and another to output to a TV Typewriter, allowing the user to construct an all-in-one machine that did not need an external computer terminal to work. This also left the serial port free, which could be used to drive a teletype machine as a computer printer, or a punch tape system for storage.

Processor Technology later combined the 3P+S with the VDM-1 graphics card in a compact S-100 machine of their own to produce the Sol-20, the first all-in-one mass-produced personal computer.
