= Lee Felsenstein =

American computer engineer (born 1945)

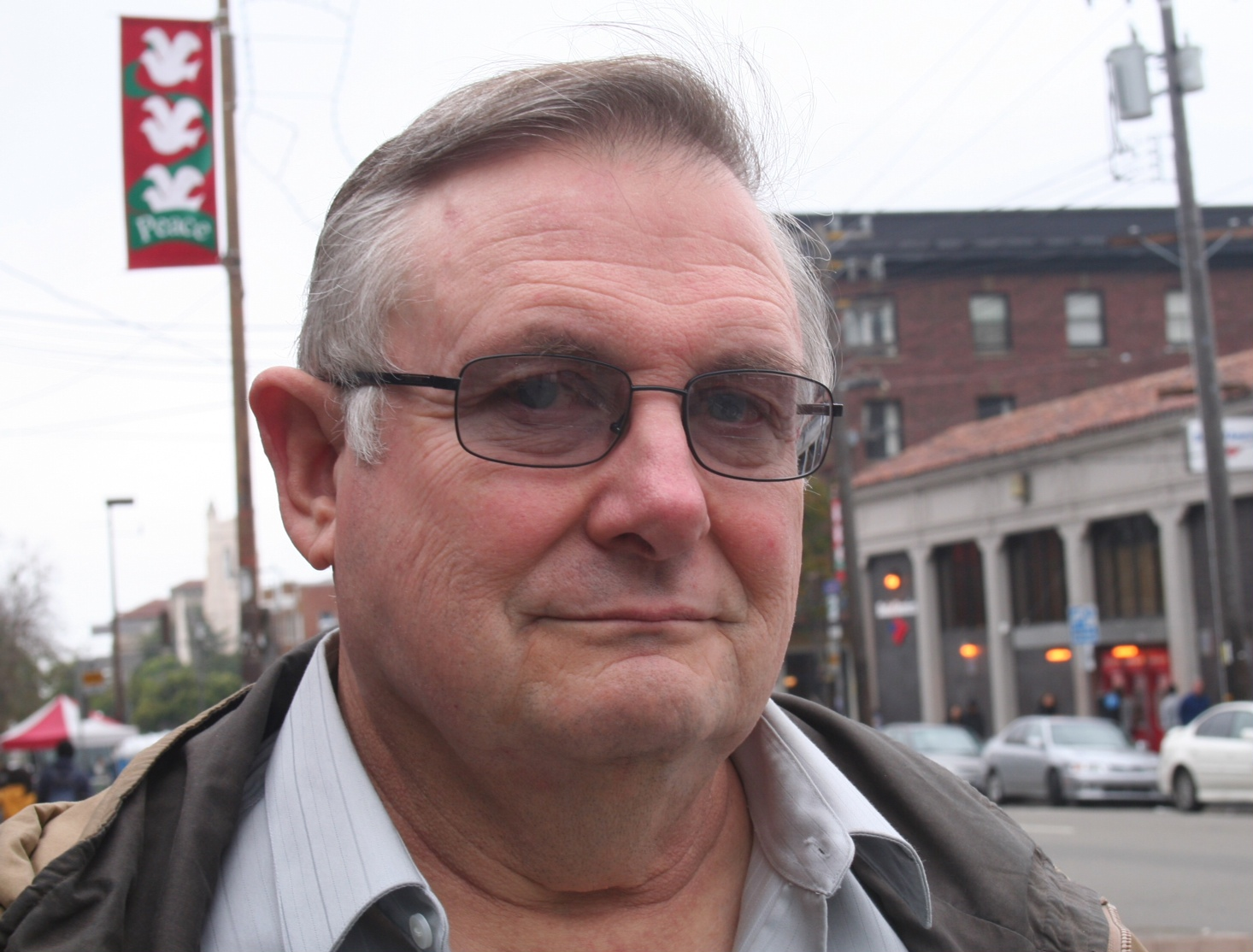
- Felsenstein in 2010
- Born: April 27, 1945 (age 81); Philadelphia, Pennsylvania, United States
- Education: University of California, Berkeley
- Scientific career
- Fields: Computer engineering
- Workplaces: Osborne Computer Corporation, Interval Research Corporation, Pemstar Pacific Consultants
- Website: felsensigns.com

Lee Felsenstein (born April 27, 1945) is an American computer engineer who played a central role in the development of personal computers. He was one of the original members of the Homebrew Computer Club and the designer of the Osborne 1, the first mass-produced portable computer.

Before the Osborne, Felsenstein designed the Intel 8080 based Sol-20 computer from Processor Technology, the PennyWhistle modem, and other early "S-100 bus" era designs. His shared-memory alphanumeric video display design, the Processor Technology VDM-1 video display module board, was widely copied and became the basis for the standard display architecture of personal computers.

Many of his designs were leaders in reducing costs of computer technologies for the purpose of making them available to large markets. His work featured a concern for the social impact of technology and was influenced by the philosophy of Ivan Illich. Felsenstein was the engineer for the Community Memory project, one of the earliest attempts to place networked computer terminals in public places to facilitate social interactions among individuals, in the era before the commercial Internet.

== Life ==
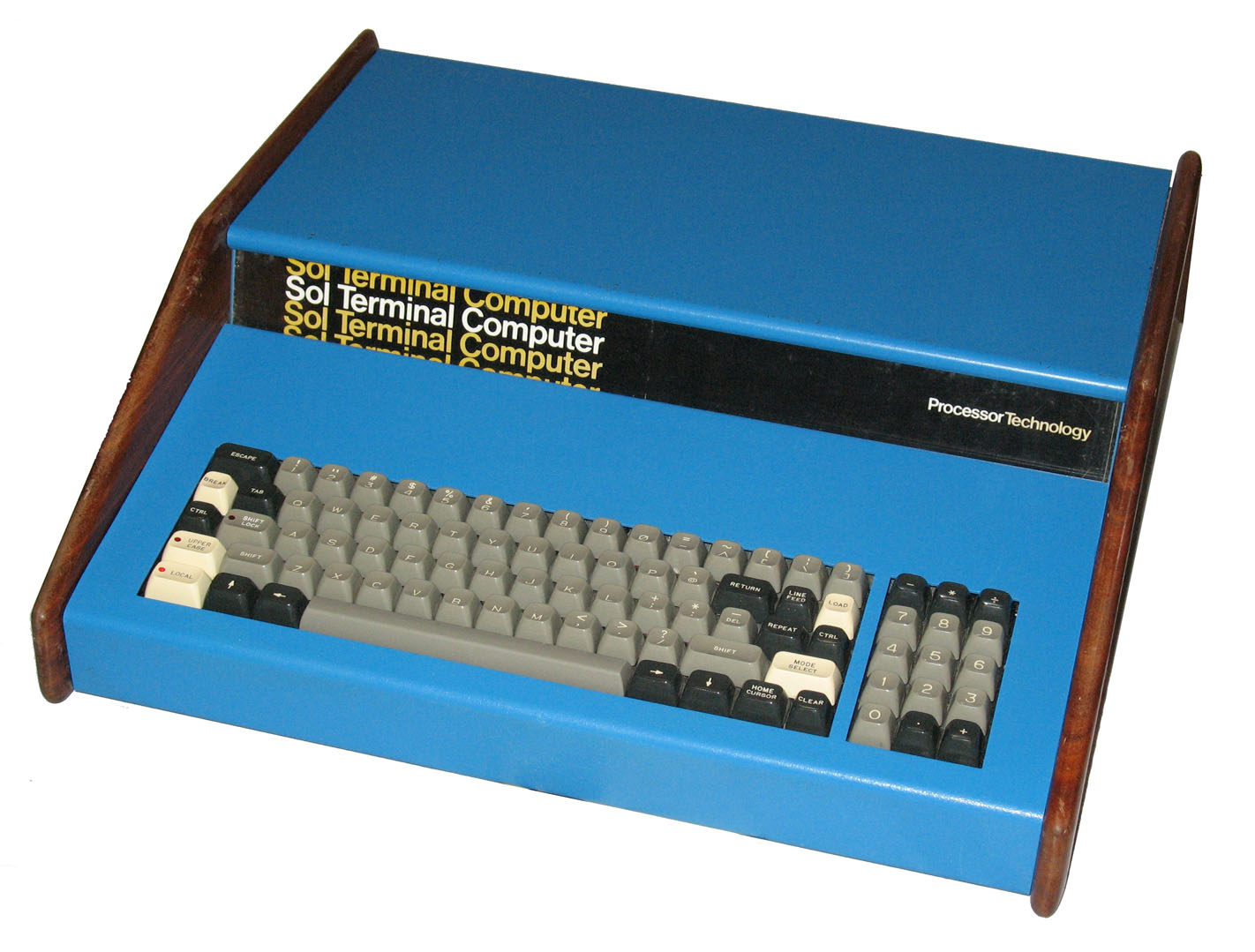
Processor Technology Sol-20 computer designed by Lee Felsenstein

Felsenstein graduated from Central High School in Philadelphia as a member of class 219. As a young man, Felsenstein was a New Left radical. From October through December 1964, he was a participant in the Free Speech Movement and was one of 768 arrested in the climactic "Sproul Hall Sit-In" of December 2–3, 1964. He also wrote for the Berkeley Barb, one of the leading underground newspapers.

He had entered University of California, Berkeley first in 1963, joined the Co-operative Work-Study Program in Engineering in 1964 and dropped out at the end of 1967, working as a Junior Engineer at the Ampex Corporation from 1968 through 1971, when he re-enrolled at Berkeley. He received a B.S. in electrical engineering and computer science from the University of California, Berkeley in 1972.

From 1981 to 1983, Felsenstein was employed at the Osborne Computer Corporation. At Osborne, he was the designer of the Osborne 1, the first mass-produced portable computer. He then returned to freelance consulting. In 1992, he joined Interval Research Corporation, where he worked until 2000. From then until 2005, he worked for Pemstar Pacific Consultants, an electronics design and contract manufacturing firm, which was subsequently acquired by Benchmark Electronics. Throughout, he acted as an occasional free-lance consulting designer or worked at his own design firm.

Many of his designs were leaders in reducing the costs of computer technologies for the purpose of making them available to large markets. His work featured a concern for the social impact of technology. The Community Memory project, begun as a project of Resource One, Inc. in 1972 and later incorporated in 1977 by Felsenstein with Efrem Lipkin, Ken Colstad, Jude Milhon, and Mark Szpakowski, was one of the earliest attempts to place networked computer terminals in such places as Berkeley supermarkets to attract casual use by persons from all walks of life passing through and facilitate social interactions among non-technical individuals, in the era before the Internet.

Felsenstein was influenced in his philosophy by the works of Ivan Illich, particularly Tools for Conviviality (Harper and Row, 1973). This book advocated a "convivial" approach to design which allowed users of technologies to learn about the technology by encouraging exploration, tinkering, and modification. Felsenstein had learned about electronics in much the same fashion, and summarized his conclusions in several aphorisms, to wit – "In order to survive in a public-access environment, a computer must grow a computer club around itself." Others were – "To change the rules, change the tools," and "If work is to become play, then tools must become toys."

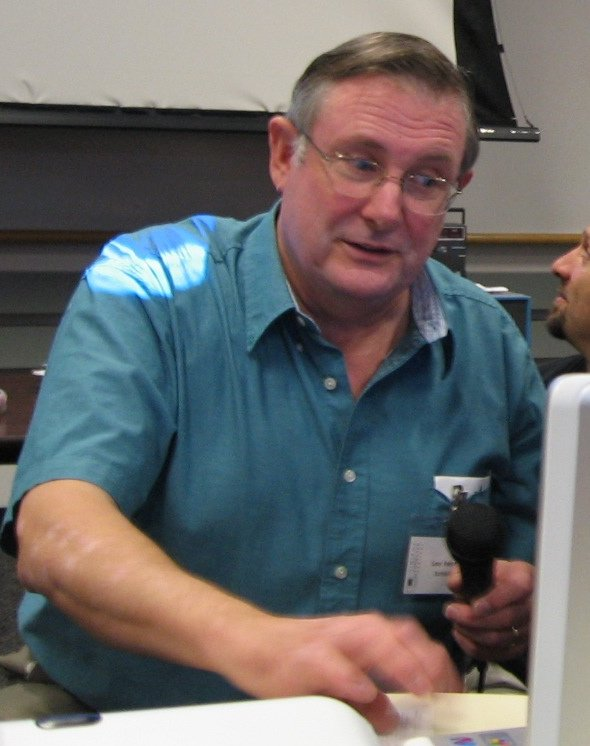
Felsenstein at the Vintage Computer Festival, 2005

Felsenstein was one of the original members of the Homebrew Computer Club, which formed in 1975 in response to the appearance of the Altair 8800 computer kit. With a handy yardstick, Felsenstein "moderated" meetings at the SLAC Auditorium. He was less a chair than a keeper of chaos. In this heyday of the development of the first personal computers, Felsenstein designed the Intel 8080 based Sol-20 computer from Processor Technology, the Micro Expander computer, the Pennywhistle modem, and other early "S-100 bus" era designs. These existed in a market space with early generation hobbyist microcomputers from Altair, IMSAI, Morrow Designs, Cromemco, and other vendors. Felsenstein's shared-memory alphanumeric video display design, the Processor Technology VDM-1 video display module board, was widely copied and became the basis for the standard display architecture of personal computers.

Felsenstein was named a "Pioneer of the Electronic Frontier" in 1994 by the Electronic Frontier Foundation, and in 2007, he was given the Editor's Choice Award for Creative Excellence by EE Times magazine. In 1998, Felsenstein founded the Free Speech Movement Archives as an online repository of historical information relating to that event, its antecedents and successors.

In 2003, while working with the Jhai Foundation of San Francisco, he designed an open-source telecommunications and computer system for installation in remote villages in the developing world. This system was dubbed "the Pedal-Powered Internet" by The New York Times Magazine due to its reliance on pedal power generation. Installation of the first system in Laos was unsuccessful, but the design has been tested on an Indian reservation in the US and continues in development in India. In 2003, Felsenstein was named a Laureate of The Tech Museum of Innovation (San Jose, California) for this work.

Felsenstein is the Founding Sensei of the Hacker Dojo in Mountain View, California, and was featured on a Fox News segment in late 2009 covering the non-profit facility.

Felsenstein's older brother is the evolutionary biologist Joseph Felsenstein, a National Academy of Sciences member whose PHYLIP system was one of the earliest examples of bioinformatics. Early versions of PHYLIP were developed on the Sol-20 and Osborne 1, computers designed by Felsenstein.

On April 16, 2016, Felsenstein was made a Fellow of the Computer History Museum, "for his influence on the technical and social environment of the early personal computing era."

== See also ==
- Community Memory
- Homebrew Computer Club
- Processor Technology
- Osborne Computer Corporation
- Open-source hardware
