= PTDOS =

Operating system

- Developer: Processor Technology
- OS family: DOS
- Working state: Historic, Unsupported
- Initial release: 1978; 47 years ago
- Available in: English
- Package manager: N/A
- Platforms: Intel 8080
- Default user interface: Command-line interface
- License: Proprietary

PTDOS or Processor Technology Disk Operating System is an operating system created in the late 1970s for computers using the Intel 8080 microprocessor and the Processor Technology Helios II Disk Memory System.

== Commands ==
The following list of commands is supported by PTDOS 1.4.

- EDIT
- EDT3
- ASSM
- DEBUG
- DO
- DISKCOPY
- RECOVER
- FILES
- FREE?
- SYST
- OPEN?
- COPY
- IMAGE
- BLDUTIL
- EXTRACT
- KILL
- RENAME
- RETYPE
- REATR
- XREF
- DUMP
- PRINT
- RNUM
- SAVE
- GET
- CREATE
- OPEN
- READ
- WRITE
- CLOSE
- SPACE
- RANDOM
- SEEK
- ENDF
- SETIN
- SETOUT
- SET
- EXEC
- ZIP
- CONFIGR
- OUT
- BASC5
- FOCAL
- TREK80
