= Trek-80 (1979 video game) =

1979 video game

- Developer: Judges Guild
- Publisher: Processor Technology Corporation
- Designer: Bruce Berry
- Platform: TRS-80
- Release: 1979

Trek-80 is a computer game developed by Judges Guild in 1979 for the TRS-80.

== Plot ==
Trek-80 is a game in which the player must destroy all the Klingon ships within a time limit and cannot lose more than five supply tugs. The player uses the warp drive to move the ship for galactic travel, and impulse drive for moving through the inner quadrant. The Enterprise and Klingon vessels are armed with phasers and photon torpedoes, but the supply tugs only have phasers. The Enterprise is also able to use a ram for an attack.

== Gameplay ==
Main gameplay screen

The screen displays an 8 × 8 square quadrant grid laid out over the galaxy as found in Trek games. The Enterprise is represented using the letter "E", and likewise Klingons use a "K", and the supply tugs use an upward pointing arrow. The on-screen display also shows the stardate, the condition of the ship, quadrant information, the energy of the ship, nearby bases, torpedoes left, and number of tugs destroyed.

== Development ==
As part of their intention to compete with TSR, Judges Guild increased the production on their print products, and also moved into producing computer games, although Trek-80 (1979) the only such game Judged Guild released.

Trek-80 was a 16K program written in BASIC by Bruce Berry, and was the first computer game produced by a wargaming company that specializes in science-fiction and fantasy. Barry used concepts drawn from Trek games that were available at the time, and innovated on them further.

== Reception ==
The game was reviewed in 1980 in The Dragon #36 by Michael Dodge. Dodge concluded the review with, "Trek-80 is a well written program and a good Star Trek game. The program's graphics are well laid out and easy to read, the mechanics are adequate, and the introductions of ramming and tugs are excellent features".

Dodge praised the addition of supply tugs, which introduced a new strategic challenge, and highlighted the ability to ram enemy ships and perform evasive manoeuvres after attacking. However, he criticised the game's slow pace, particularly the delays between movement and weapons fire. He reported that a typical session lasted approximately two hours and could continue considerably longer. Dodge also considered the self-destruct feature to have little practical purpose, as activating it immediately ended the game in defeat.
