= Xpander =

Xpander may refer to:

- Oberheim Xpander, an analog synthesizer introduced by Oberheim in 1984
- Xpander (EP), by Sasha, 1999
- HP Xpander, a touch-screen calculator by Hewlett-Packard in 2001
- Math Xpander, a software package for Windows CE handhelds by Hewlett-Packard in 2001
- Mitsubishi Xpander, a multi-purpose vehicle

== See also ==
- Expander (disambiguation)
