= Jhai Foundation =

Non-profit organisation working in Laos

The Jhai Foundation is a non-profit organisation working mainly in Laos.

The foundation's primary project is bringing communication services to rural communities lacking electricity or telephones. They developed the Jhai PC and Communication System, a solid state, low energy consuming computer that can be powered by a foot-crank generator built into a bicycle frame or solar energy, and uses a wireless network to provide VoIP and Internet services.

The JhaiPC runs Linux with a localised version of KDE. The hardware and software design and user documentation for the JhaiPC are completely open and have been released through SourceForge.net.

With the minimal communication technology provided by the JhaiPC small businesses, such as farmers in Ban Phon Kam, are able to get better prices for their products. Jhai is also introducing organic farming techniques, fair trade marketing and direct sales to these farmers.
