= VDM-1 =

Video card for S-100 bus computers

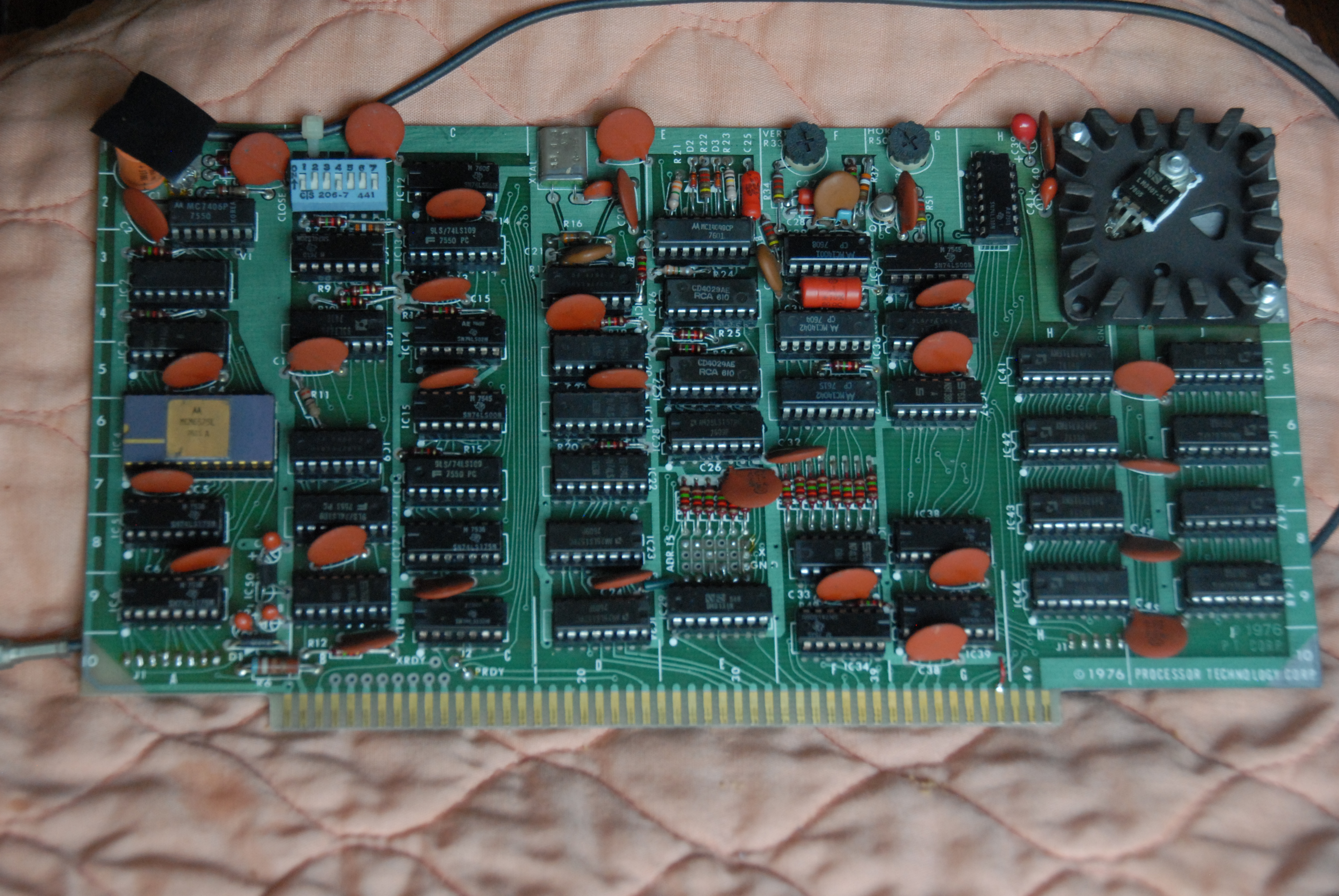
A Processor Technology VDM-1 board

The Processor Technology VDM-1, for Video Display Module, was the first video card for S-100 bus computers. It was created in 1975 and allows an S-100 machine to produce its own display. When paired with a keyboard and Processor Technology's 3P+S card, it eliminates the need for a separate video terminal. Using a 7 x 9 dot matrix and ASCII characters, it produces a 64-column by 16-row text display.

The VDM-1 is a complex card and was soon replaced by an increasing number of similar products from other companies. An early competitor was the Solid State Music VB-1, which offers an identical display from a much simpler card. Later cards using LSI chips have enough room to include the keyboard controller as well.

== History ==
=== TV Typewriter ===
In September 1973, the cover article of Radio-Electronics magazine was Don Lancaster's "Build a TV Typewriter", which allows users to type characters on a keyboard and have them appear on a conventional television. Given this limited functionality, they initially estimated that the magazine would sell about 20 copies of the plans for $20 each. Instead, they were flooded by requests and eventually sent out 10,000 copies.

Bob Marsh built a TV Typewriter and showed it to Lee Felsenstein. Felsenstein noted that it had no external memory, so once a full page of text had been typed, the entire page had to be erased to display additional text. He phoned Lancaster and asked him about this design note, and Lancaster replied that he simply hadn't considered using it as the basis of a terminal, "I don't know – people just want to put up characters on their TV screens".

=== Tom Swift Terminal ===
Throughout 1973, Felsenstein had been looking for a low-cost terminal for the Community Memory bulletin board system. He had designed the Pennywhistle modem to address the need for remote access at a price under $100, but the terminal that they hooked it up to still cost $1500 (equivalent to $10,900 in 2025).

Felsenstein began designing a printed circuit board that would combine the video output of the TV Typewriter with 1024 bytes of memory so it could hold a page of text in ASCII format and send it to a video monitor. He called the resulting design "The Tom Swift Terminal", after the Tom Swift books. The design manual also had an extended section on the concept of "convivial design" (essentially "friendly"), which argued that a device's social utility was inversely proportional to its complexity, and thus devices should be as simple and open-ended as possible.

Felsenstein sold the design document to local hobbyists, and wrote an article on it in the People's Computer Company in early 1974. By 1975, the system had still not been assembled by anyone.

=== VDM-1 ===
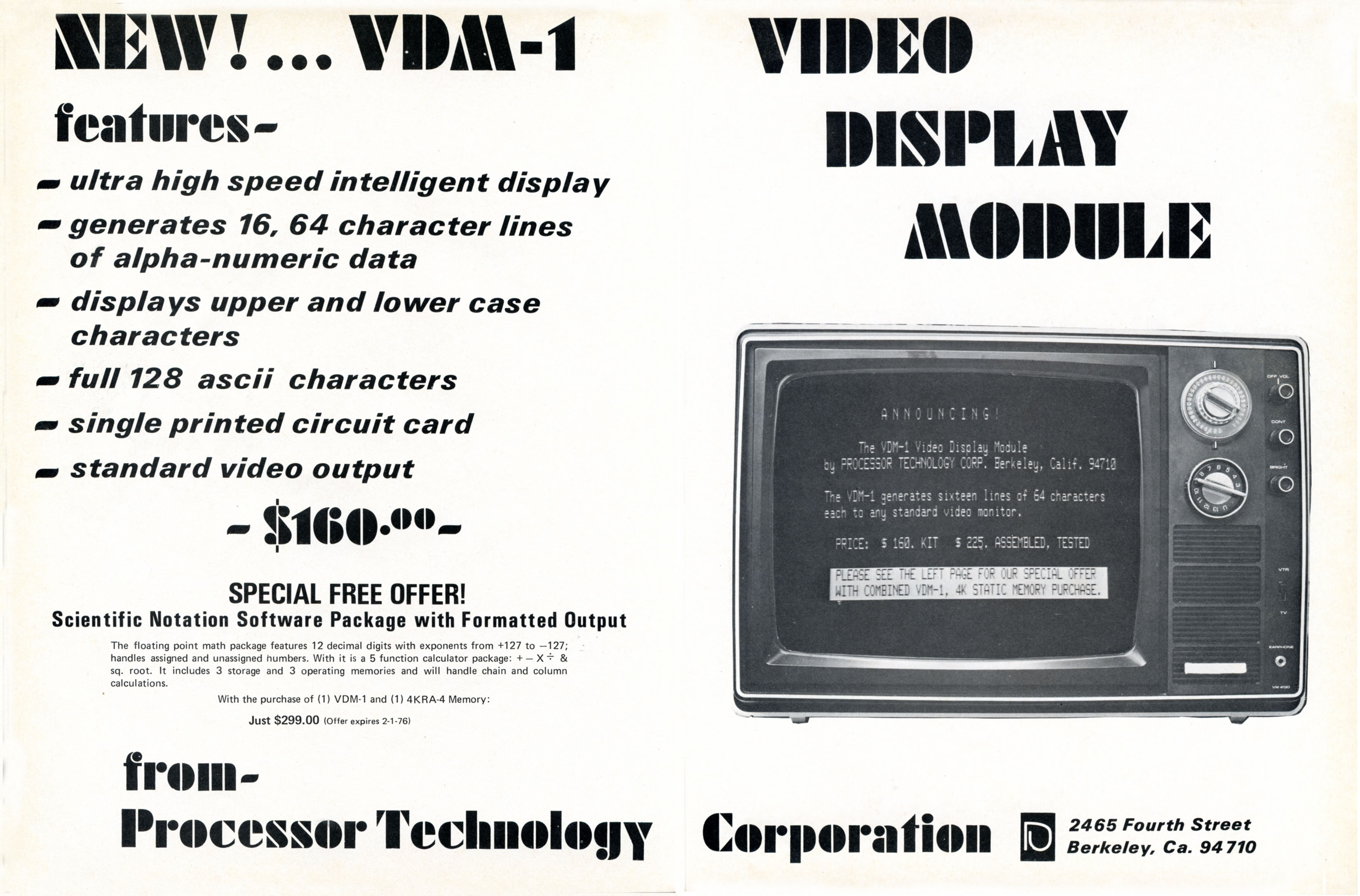
Early January 1976 Byte advertisement for the VDM-1

In April 1975, Bob Marsh and Gary Ingram formed Processor Technology, initially to sell expansion cards for the Altair microcomputer. Marsh approached Felsenstein with the idea of modifying the Tom Swift design to work with the Altair, which had been released that January. A key aspect of the resulting design was the use of electronic switches that allow the display and the computer to access different parts of the on-board memory at the same time, which means the display hardware does not have to stop the computer while it is drawing. (Note: Today this concept is implemented using dual-ported RAM.) The prototype was completed in less than three months.

As soon as the prototype was ready, Steve Dompier began porting Star Trek to it, replacing its serial output with a more game-like display to produce Trek-80. The system went on sale soon after at a price of $199 for the kit version. As reviews of the era noted, an Altair compatible machine equipped with a keyboard, the VDM-1, and an appropriate monitor (from Radio Shack) cost less than a typical smart terminal of the era.

=== Sol-20 ===
Les Solomon, whose Popular Electronics cover article had launched the Altair, was looking for someone to build an all-in-one machine that avoided the need for multiple cards from multiple vendors. He first approached Don Lancaster, who created the original TV Typewriter, and introduced him to Ed Roberts of MITS, the creator of the Altair. The two immediately began fighting and any idea of a partnership ended.

As Solomon put it:

I went to Phoenix, loaded Don and his typewriter into the car, and took off for Albuquerque and MITS. One thing I must say for Don Lancaster and Ed Roberts: they both have very strong personalities. When I got them together in Ed's office, the clash was pretty fierce. Since the Altair and the TV typewriter were not compatible, something had to give. Neither man, however, would give an inch.

In December 1975, Solomon approached Marsh, asking him if he could make this all-in-one "intelligent terminal" design. If he did it within 30 days, Solomon would put it on the cover of the magazine. Marsh again turned to Felsenstein to design it, and as soon as they began discussing it, it was clear the best solution was a complete computer system. This would basically be a low-end computer with the VDM as its output. Felsenstein initially wanted to use a different processor, but eventually concluded the Intel 8080 was the best solution.

As Felsenstein worked on the design, Marsh continually added new required features, leading to a case of feature creep. The design was finally completed after two months. The result is the Sol-20, one of the earliest all-in-one computer designs.

=== VDM-2 ===
Sometime later, Felsenstein returned to the design in order to make a new version that would have 24 lines of 80 columns, which was becoming a standard. The VDM-1 had 16 rows simply because 64 x 16 = 1,024, the amount of memory on the card. It also added a split-screen feature that allowed the upper and lower sections to be scrolled independently, and place the split at any line. It also added smooth scrolling, greyscale and flashing.

By the summer of 1979, Felsenstein had a partially assembled version and took it to the Javits Convention Center in New York City to show it to the Processor Technology people. After looking for the booth for some time, he found that the company had closed. He could not find a buyer for the design.

== Description ==
The VDM-1 uses a single slot in the S-100 backplane, but is so thick it covers adjacent slots in most machines. The front side of the board was crammed with components, including eight 91L02A 1,024 bit static RAMs, to the point that there was not enough room left for the required electrical traces. This was solved by running a ribbon cable from one side of the board to the other. The monitor is connected via a coaxial cable running off the top corner of the card.

The board generates 16 lines of 64 characters on a monitor or a conventional television that is slightly modified to bypass the radio frequency section. The display is black and white, and the hardware includes the ability to support inverse video, which they refer to as "cursor bytes", by setting the high bit on the character byte. With the appropriate switch set on the settings DIP switch, any such character will blink. This supplies the hardware cursor display by setting this bit on a space character.

One oddity of the system is that the character graphics were supplied in ROM, and there are several versions of the ROMs with different glyphs. The user could not know in advance which version he would receive.
