= Processor Technology =

Personal computer company, founded 1975

Processor Technology Corporation

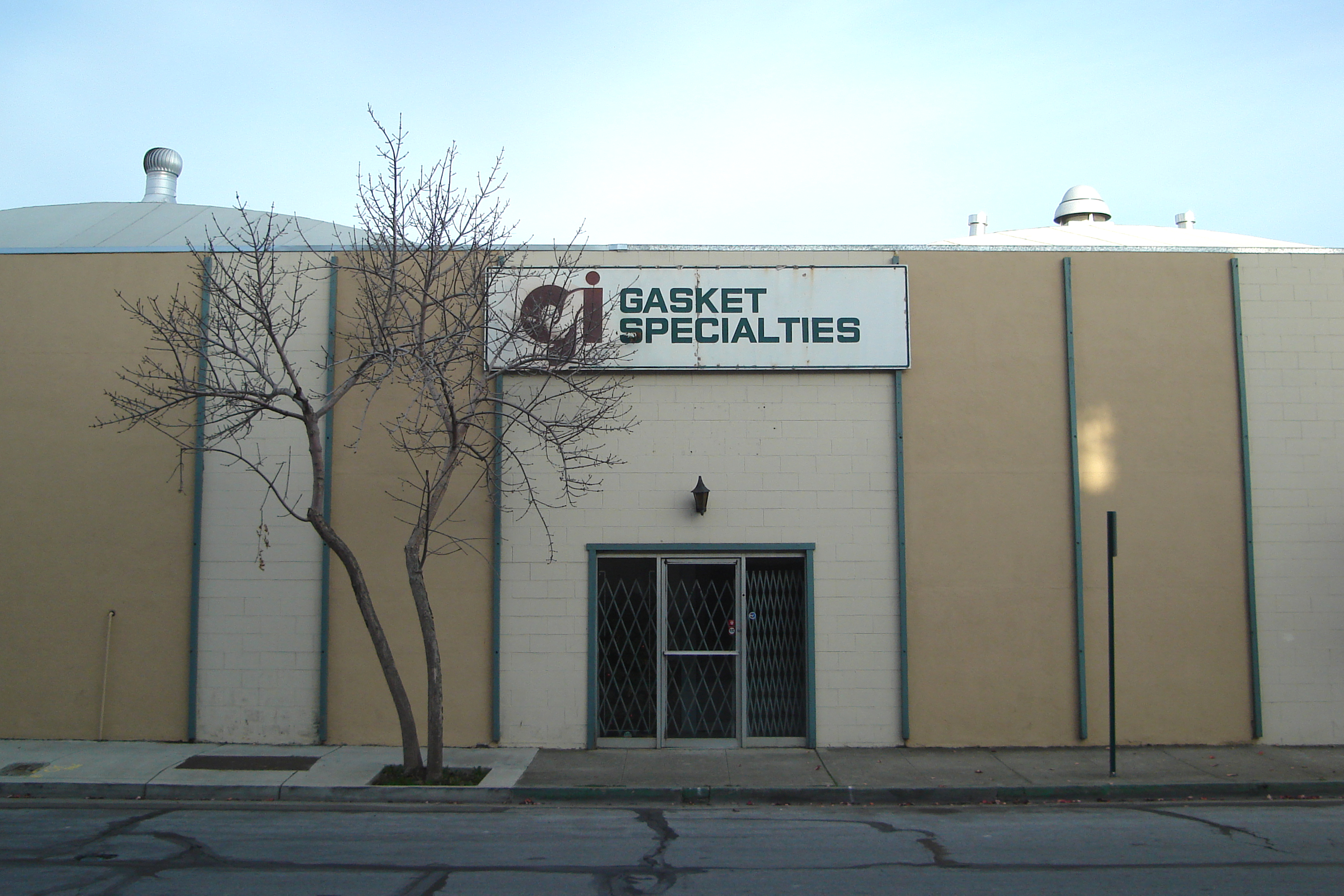
- 6200 Hollis Street in Emeryville, California, site of Processor Technology Corporation's former headquarters
- Industry: Computer
- Founded: April 1975; 51 years ago in Berkeley, California
- Founder: Gary Ingram; Bob Marsh
- Defunct: May 1979; 46 years ago
- Fate: Dissolved

Processor Technology Corporation was a personal computer company founded in April 1975, by Gary Ingram and Bob Marsh in Berkeley, California. Their first product was a 4K byte RAM board that was compatible with the MITS Altair 8800 computer but more reliable than the MITS board. This was followed by a series of memory and I/O boards including a video display module.

Popular Electronics magazine wanted a feature article on an intelligent computer terminal and Technical Editor Les Solomon asked Marsh and Lee Felsenstein to design one. It was featured on the July 1976, cover and became the Sol-20 Personal Computer. The first units were shipped in December 1976 and the Sol-20 was a very successful product. The company failed to develop next generation products and ceased operations in May 1979.

== History ==
Bob Marsh, Lee Felsenstein and Gordon French started designing the Sol-20 between April and July 1975. The Sol-20 utilized the Intel 8080 8-bit microprocessor chip, running at 2 MHz. A major difference between the Sol-20 and most other machines of the era was its built-in video driver, which allowed it to be attached to a composite monitor for display. The Sol-20 consisted of a main motherboard (PCB) mounted at the bottom of the case, and a five slot S-100 bus card cage. The main PCB consisted of the CPU, memory, video display, I/O circuits. Inside the case included power supply, fan, and keyboard. The case was painted 'IBM blue' and the sides of the case were made of solid oiled walnut originally salvaged from a gun stock manufacturer.

Processor Technology manufactured approximately 10,000 Sol-20 personal computers between 1977 and 1979. All Processor Technology products were available either fully assembled, or as electronic kits. Processor Technology also sold software on Compact Cassette. One side of the tape was recorded in CUTS format, and the other side was Kansas City standard format. Gary Ingram and Steven Dompier wrote the original software utilities. Lee Felsenstein wrote the original user manuals as a contractor.

== Standards ==
Processor Technology also designed several S-100 bus boards. The boards were meant to be compatible with the circuits of Sol-20.

The Video Display Module 1 (VDM-1) was the original video display interface for S-100 bus systems. The board generates sixteen 64-character lines of upper and lower case typeface on any standard composite video monitor or a modified TV set. Utilizing a 1,024 byte (1K) segment of system memory, the VDM-1 provided memory-mapped I/O for high performance, and also included hardware support for scrolling. The VDM-1 Video Board was a great improvement over using a teletype machine or a serial attached terminal, and was popular for owners of other S-100 bus systems such as the IMSAI 8080.

Another popular product was the CUTS Tape I/O Interface S-100 board. The CUTS board offered standard interface for saving and reading data from cassette tape, supporting both the Kansas City standard format, as well as their own custom CUTS format. Lee Felsenstein was key participant of the development of Kansas City standard format, the first cross-system data transfer standard for microcomputers.

== Products ==
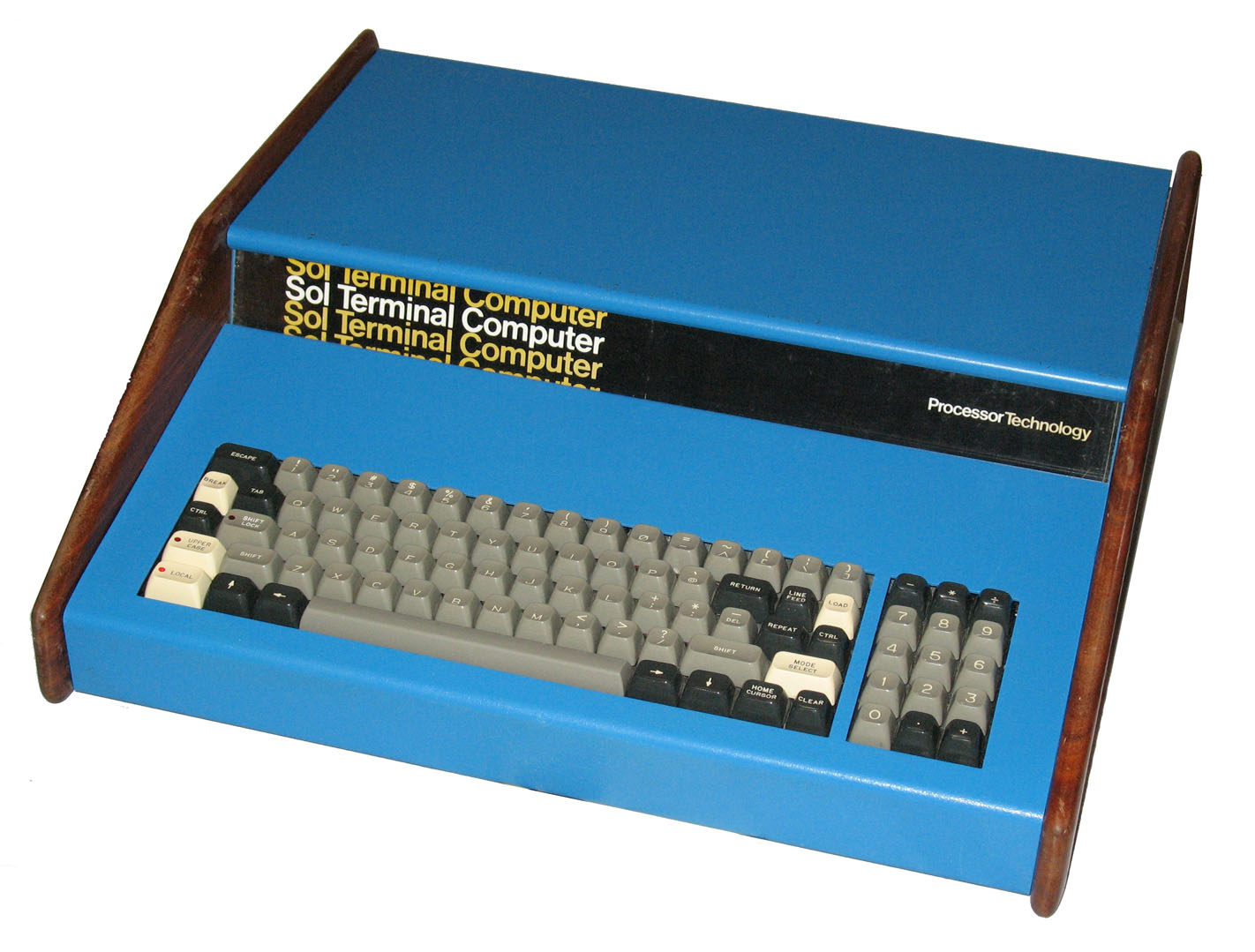
Processor Technology Sol-20 Computer designed by Bob Marsh, Lee Felsenstein and Gordon French

- Computers
  - Sol-PC — Single circuit board only without case or power supply; available as fully assembled or as kit form
  - Sol-10 Terminal Computer — Stripped-down model without 5 slot S-100 backplane; available as fully assembled or as kit form
  - Sol-20 Terminal Computer — Includes 5-slot S-100 backplane; available as fully assembled or as kit form
    - Sol-20 price 1976 approximately $5000 CND with extra 16K card
- S-100 bus boards
  - VDM-1 — Video Display Module Board
  - 3P+S — Input/Output Module 3 Parallel plus 1 Serial Board
  - 4KRA — 4K Static Memory Board
  - 8KRA — 8K Static Memory Board
  - 16KRA — 16K DRAM memory board
  - 32KRA-1 — 32K DRAM memory board
  - CUTS — Tape I/O Interface Board, CUTS format and Kansas City standard format
  - 2KRO — EPROM memory board
  - Helios II Disk Memory System
  - GPM — General Purpose Memory, ROM board held CUTER Monitor Program
- Software
  - SOLOS — operating system
  - CUTER — monitor program and cassette tape loader.
  - ASSM — 8080 assembler
  - BASIC/5 — 5K BASIC programming language
  - Extended Cassette Basic (8K) — BASIC Interpreter
  - FOCAL programming language
  - ALS-8
  - PTDOS — operating system for use with the Helios II Disk Drive
  - EDIT — 8080 Editor
  - 8080 Chess — Chess Game
  - TREK-80 — Star Trek Themed Game
  - GamePack 1 — Collection of Games - Volume 1
  - GamePack 2 — Collection of Games - Volume 2

== Works cited ==
- Freiberger, Paul; Swaine, Michael (2000). Fire in the Valley: The Making of the Personal Computer (2nd ed.). New York, NY: McGraw-Hill. ISBN 0-07-135892-7.
- Veit, Stan (1993). Stan Veit's History of the Personal Computer. Alexander, North Carolina: WorldComm Press. ISBN 1-56664-030-X.
