= Community Memory =

Public computerized bulletin board system

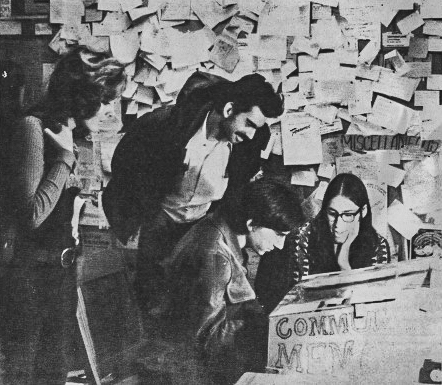
Community Memory terminal at Leopold's Records, Berkeley, CA, 1973

Community Memory (CM) was the first public computerized bulletin board system. Established in 1973 in Berkeley, California, it used an SDS 940 timesharing system in San Francisco connected via a 110 baud link to a Teletype Model 33 teleprinter, essentially a computer printer and keyboard (a hard copy terminal that prints both input and output), in Leopold's Records record store in Berkeley, California to let users enter and retrieve messages. Individuals could place messages in the computer and then look through the memory for a specific notice.

While initially conceived as an information and resource sharing network linking a variety of counter-cultural economic, educational, and social organizations with each other and the public, Community Memory was soon generalized to be an information flea market, by providing unmediated, two-way access to message databases through public computer terminals. Once the system became available, the users demonstrated that it was a general communications medium that could be used for art, literature, journalism, commerce, and social chatter.

== People ==
Community Memory was created by Lee Felsenstein, Efrem Lipkin, Ken Colstad, Jude Milhon, and Mark Szpakowski, acting as The Community Memory Project within the Resource One computer center at Project One in San Francisco. This group of computer savvy friends and partners wanted to create a simple system that could function as a source of community information. Felsenstein took care of hardware, Lipkin software, and Szpakowski user interface and information husbandry. Community Memory in its first phase (1973–1975) was an experiment to see how people would react to using a computer to exchange information. At that time few people had any direct contact with computers. CM was conceived as a tool to help strengthen the Berkeley community. Their brochure states that "strong, free, non-hierarchical channels of communication--whether by computer and modem, pen and ink, telephone, or face-to-face--are the front line of reclaiming and revitalizing our communities."

The creators and founders of Community Memory shared the values of northern California counterculture of the 1960s, which included the celebration of free speech and the anti-war movement. They were also supporters of ecological, low cost, decentralized, and user-friendly technology.

CM had a presence in Vancouver starting in July 1974, led by Andrew Clement. A second incarnation of Community Memory, aimed at creating a global information network, appeared in the later seventies. Its major players were Efrem Lipkin and Ken Colstad.

In his book Hackers: Heroes of the Computer Revolution, Steven Levy described how the founders of Community Memory began the organization. Some of the founders were involved in the Homebrew Computer Club, an organization credited with significant impact in the development of the personal computer.

== History ==
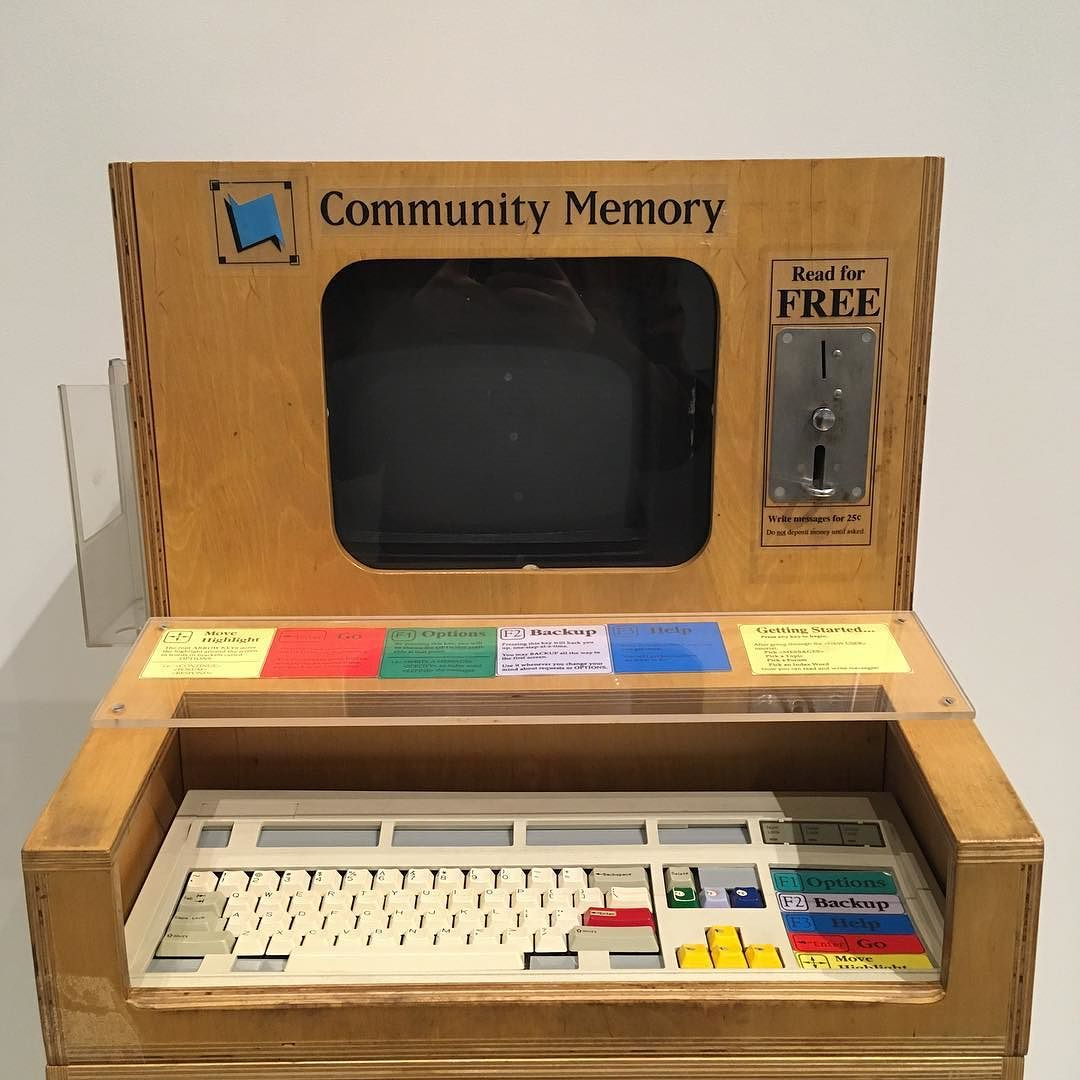
Community Memory terminal at the Computer History Museum

The first terminal was a Teletype Model 33 connected to the SDS 940 computer by telephone, using a 10 character per second acoustic coupled modem. It was located at the top of the stairs leading to Leopold's Records in Berkeley, right next to a busy conventional bulletin board. The Teletype machine was noisy, so it was encased in a cardboard box, with a transparent plastic top so what was being printed out could be seen, and with holes for one's hands while typing. This was the first time many individuals who were not studying a scientific subject had the opportunity to be able to use a computer.

Brief instructions were mounted above the modified keyboard showing how to send a message to the mainframe, how to attach keywords to it to make it searchable and how to search those keywords to find messages from others. To use a Community Memory terminal, the user would type the command ADD, followed by the text of the item, and then by any keywords under which he/she desired the item to be indexed. To search for an item, the user would type the command FIND followed by a logical structure of keywords connected with ANDs, ORs and NOTs. By the side sat a CM assistant, attracting people's attention and encouraging them to add and find messages. In its approach, Community Memory adopted a creative method to funding the project. They provided users with coin-operated terminals which could be read without charge; however, in order to post an opinion, users were required to pay twenty-five cents or one dollar to start a new forum.

The record store and its bulletin board brought together drummers seeking fusion guitarists, bagel aficionados looking for sources, and the first poets of the medium, notably one who went by the nom de plume of Dr. Benway — the first net personality. Periodically directories of recently added items or of musician-related messages would be printed out and left there. In other terminal locations, users sought out complete strangers to assemble car pools, organize study groups, find chess partners, or even pass tips on good restaurants. According to Colstad and Lipkin, the rate of use of the system was fairly high and constant in relation to the environment of the terminals. About fifty searches and ten additions occurred each day at each location. Given the length of individual sessions with the system this was at least one-third the maximum capacity of a terminal.

Anonymity was possible with Community Memory because users were not required to share their names or register to use the system. All of the information on the system is community generated, which has two implications. Firstly, there was no central authority of any kind that establishes what information is available in the system. The second implication is that information is not imported from other sites.

The original Berkeley Whole Earth Access Store on Shattuck Avenue got the Leopold's Records Teletype Model 33 ASR. When CRT-based terminals became more cheaply available one was set up at the original Berkeley Whole Earth Access Store and another at the Mission Branch Library in San Francisco. The character of the message base varied with location.

The Community Memory software was implemented as an extension of the ROGIRS keyword information retrieval system written by Bart Berger and John M. Cooney at Resource One, which in turn was derived from Robert Shapiro's MIRS (Meta Information Retrieval System). It was written in QSPL and ran on an SDS 940, an early timesharing system the size of eight refrigerators, originally used by Douglas Engelbart in The Mother of All Demos, which had been donated to Resource One for community use.

By 1974, it was apparent that Community Memory needed to move from its home on the XDS-940 (which was large, underpowered, and uneconomical) and be recast as a network of more modern minicomputers. It was shut down in January 1975; its staff left Resource One and began to explore funding for a new project which would develop the software for a replicable and networked version of Community Memory.

== See also ==
- What the Dormouse Said: How the Sixties Counterculture Shaped the Personal Computer Industry, history of the XDS-940 and Resource One
- Community informatics
- Hacker Ethic
- SF Net, a San Francisco Bay Area coin-operated BBS with public access terminals
