= The Hacker Ethic =

The Hacker Ethic may refer to:

- Hacker ethic
- The Hacker Ethic and the Spirit of the Information Age
