= Gridz =

1997 video game

- Developer: Green Dragon Creations
- Publisher: Green Dragon Creations
- Platform: Macintosh
- Release: WW: 1997
- Genres: Puzzle video game, action game
- Modes: Single-player, multiplayer

Gridz is a video game developed and published by Green Dragon for the Macintosh.

== Gameplay ==
Gridz is a game that is part puzzle and part action game set in an artificial cyber environment.

== Reception ==
Next Generation reviewed the Macintosh version of the game, rating it three stars out of five, and stated that "Gridz is a fun, simple game, but after the sixth or seventh level, it gets a bit redundant. What elevates this game above mediocrity is an unusual clarity of purpose in graphics, control, and design."

The editors of Macworld named Gridz the best arcade game of 1997. Steven Levy and Cameron Crotty of the magazine called the game "addictive" and "maddeningly compelling".

== Reviews ==
- MacWorld
- MacWorld (1.2 update)
- MacHome Journal review
- MacAddict
- https://archive.org/details/MacAddict-016-199712/page/n69/mode/2up?q=gridz
- https://archive.org/details/Macworld9801January1998/page/n81/mode/2up?q=gridz
- https://archive.org/stream/macmagazin_german/Mac%20Magazin%201998-09#page/n63/mode/2up/search/gridz
- http://www.insidemacgames.com/news/story.php?ArticleID=6500
