= In the Plex =

Book by Steven Levy

In The Plex: How Google Thinks, Works, and Shapes Our Lives
- Author: Steven Levy
- Language: English
- Subject: Google
- Genre: Nonfiction
- Publisher: Simon & Schuster
- Publication date: 12 July 2011 (US); 28 July 2011 (UK); 30 July 2011 (Asia)
- Publication place: United States
- Media type: Print (hardcover)
- Pages: 424
- ISBN: 978-1-4165-9658-5
- LC Class: HD9696.8.U64 G6657 2011
- Preceded by: The Perfect Thing

In The Plex: How Google Thinks, Works, and Shapes Our Lives is a 2011 book by American technology reporter Steven Levy. It covers the growth of the Google company from its academic project origins at Stanford to the company that is rolling in billions of long-tail advertising dollars, forms the central exchange for information on the internet, having by then already grown to 24,000 employees.

== Synopsis ==
=== Contents ===
- The World According to Google: Biography of a Search Engine
- Googlenomics: Cracking the Code on Internet Profits
- Don't be Evil: How Google Built Its Culture
- Google's Cloud: Building Data Centers That Hold Everything Ever Written
- Outside the Box: The Google Phone Company and the Google TV Company
- GuGe: Google's Moral Dilemma in China
- Google.gov: is What's Good for Google, Good for Government --- or the Public?
- Epilogue: Chasing Taillights

== Reception ==
Siva Vaidhyanathan writes in The Washington Post: "Others have tried to make Google’s problem-solving processes intelligible and gripping. Levy has outdone them all. He has produced the most interesting book ever written about Google. He makes the biggest intellectual challenges of computer science seem endlessly fun and fascinating." Kirkus Reviews sums up the book as: "Outstanding reportage delivered in the upbeat, informative fashion for which Levy is well known."
