= Backchannel (disambiguation) =

A backchannel is a real-time online conversation using networked computers that takes place alongside live spoken remarks.

Backchannel may also refer to:

- Back Channel, Port of Long Beach, a canal in California
- Return channel, a low-speed, or less-than-optimal, telecommunications transmission channel in the opposite direction to the main channel
- Backchanneling, the method a malicious malware program uses to secretly communicate to command and control servers from a compromised computer
- Backchannel diplomacy or Track II diplomacy, an unofficial channel of communication between states or other political entities
- Backchannel (linguistics), listener responses that can be both verbal and non-verbal in nature
- Backchanneling, an organizational practice in business that involves bypassing recognized or official chains of command in order to create vulnerability at the level(s) skipped
- Backchannel (blog), a technology publication on the blog-publishing platform Medium
