= Hacker ethic =

Common moral values of hacker culture

The hacker ethic is a philosophy and set of moral values within hacker culture. Practitioners believe that sharing information and data with others is an ethical imperative. The hacker ethic is related to the concept of freedom of information, as well as the political theories of anti-authoritarianism, anarchism, and libertarianism.

While some tenets of the hacker ethic were described in other texts like Computer Lib/Dream Machines (1974) by Ted Nelson, the term hacker ethic is generally attributed to journalist Steven Levy, who appears to have been the first to document both the philosophy and the founders of the philosophy in his 1984 book titled Hackers: Heroes of the Computer Revolution.

== History ==
The term hacker originated at the Massachusetts Institute of Technology in the 1950s–1960s. The term "hacker" has long been used there to describe college pranks that MIT students would regularly devise, and was used more generally to describe a project undertaken or a product built to fulfill some constructive goal, but also out of pleasure for mere involvement.

MIT housed an early IBM 704 computer inside the Electronic Accounting Machinery (EAM) room in 1959. This room became the staging grounds for early hackers, as MIT students from the Tech Model Railroad Club sneaked inside the EAM room after hours to attempt programming the 30-ton, 9-foot-tall (2.7 m) computer.

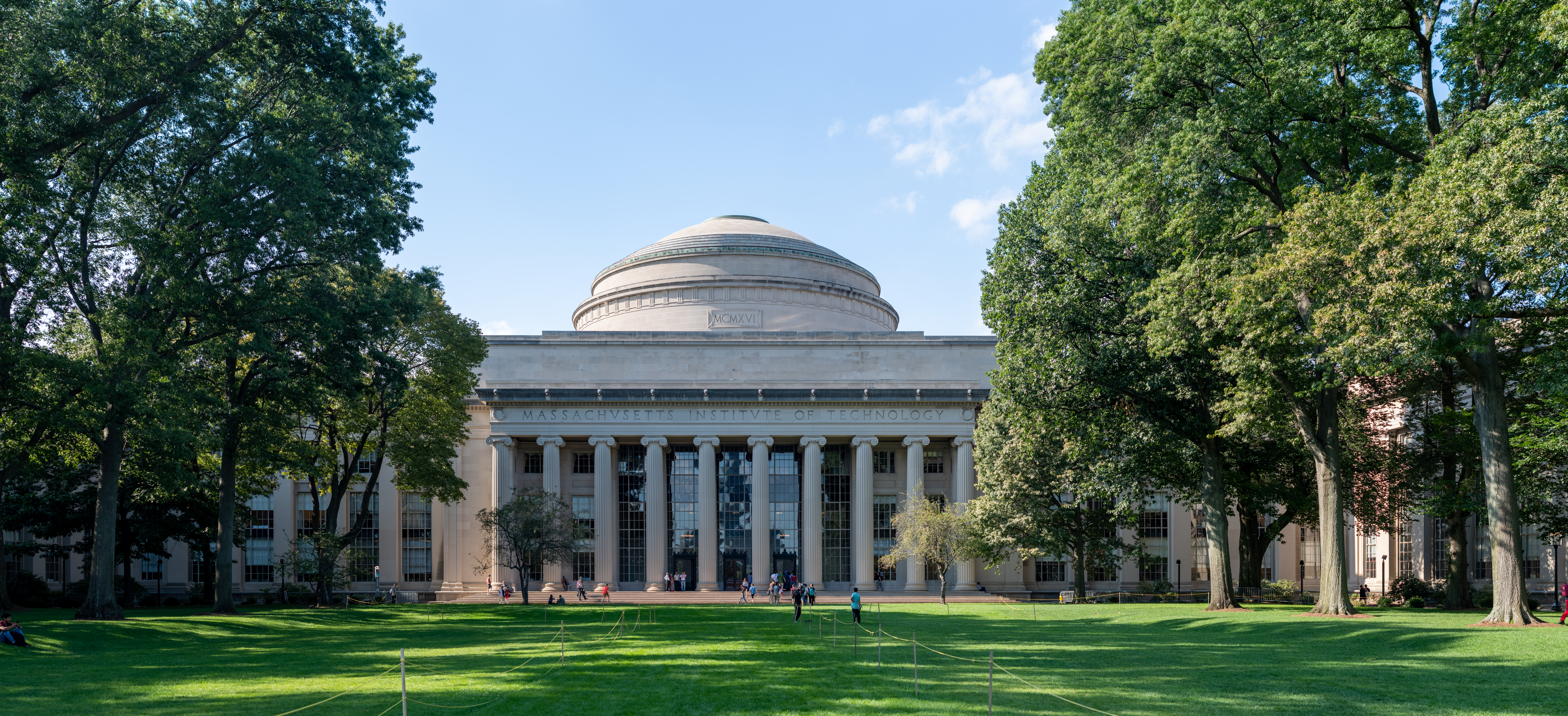
The term "hacker" originated at MIT.

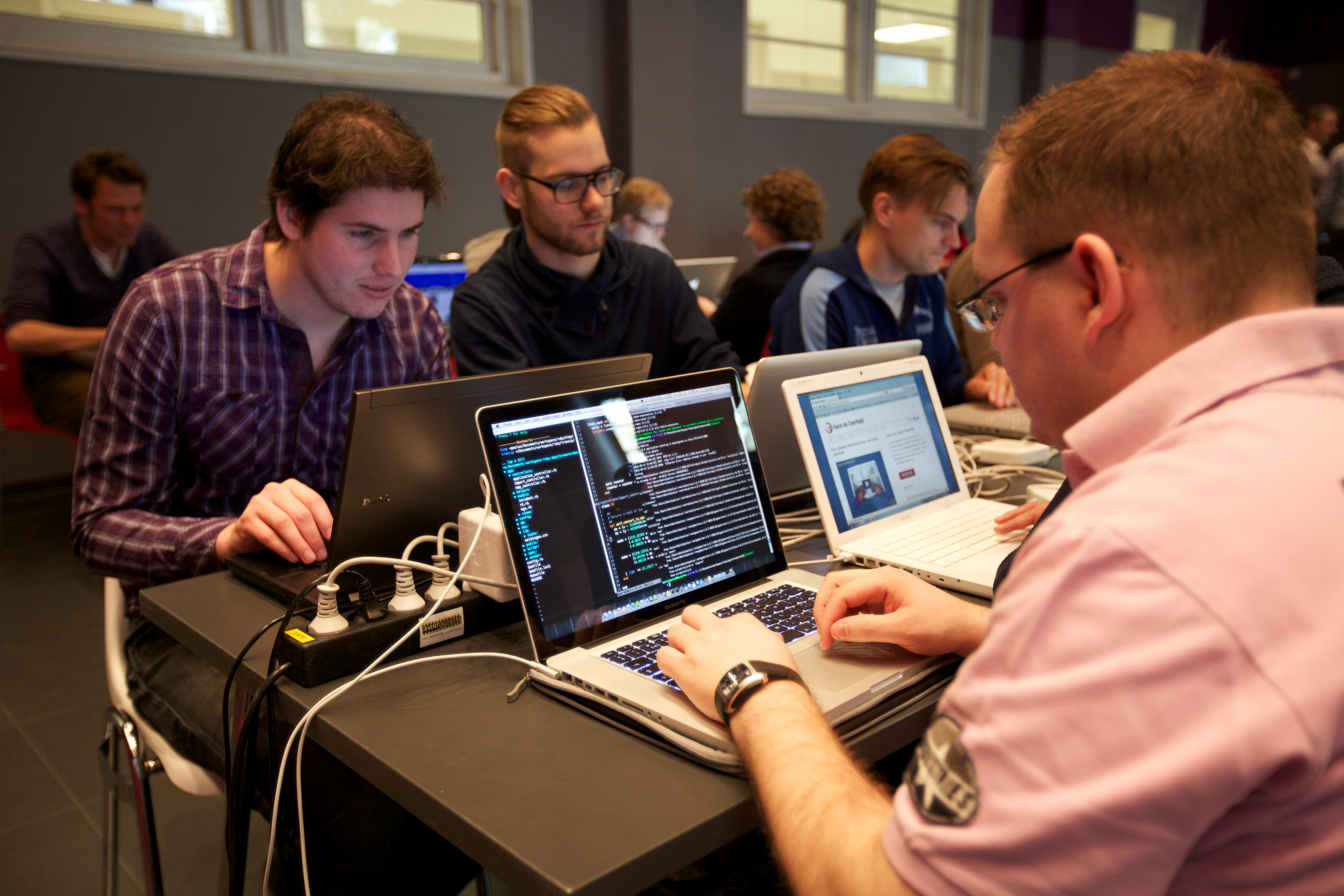
Hackers in action

The hacker ethic was described as a "new way of life, with a philosophy, an ethic and a dream". However, the elements of the hacker ethic were not openly debated and discussed; rather they were implicitly accepted and silently agreed upon.

The free software movement was born in the early 1980s from followers of the hacker ethic. Its founder, Richard Stallman, is referred to by Steven Levy as "the last true hacker".

Richard Stallman describes:

"The hacker ethic refers to the feelings of right and wrong, to the ethical ideas this community of people had—that knowledge should be shared with other people who can benefit from it, and that important resources should be utilized rather than wasted."

He further states more precisely that hacking and ethics are two separate issues:

"Just because someone enjoys hacking does not mean he has an ethical commitment to treating other people properly. Some hackers care about ethics—I do, for instance—but that is not part of being a hacker, it is a separate trait. [...] Hacking is not primarily about an ethical issue.
[...] hacking tends to lead a significant number of hackers to think about ethical questions in a certain way. I would not want to completely deny all connection between hacking and views on ethics."

The notion of moral indifference between hackers characterized the persistent actions of computer culture in the 1970s and early 1980s. According to Kirkpatrick, author of The Hacker Ethic, the "computer plays the role of God, whose requirements took priority over the human ones of sentiment when it came to assessing one's duty to others."

According to Kirkpatrick's The Hacker Ethic:

"Exceptional single-mindedness and determination to keep plugging away at a problem until the optimal solution had been found are well-documented traits of the early hackers. Willingness to work right through the night on a single programming problem are widely cited as features of the early 'hacker' computer culture."

The hacker culture is placed in the context of 1960s youth culture when American youth culture challenged the concept of capitalism and big, centralized structures. The hacker culture was a subculture within 1960s counterculture. The hackers' main concern was challenging the idea of technological expertise and authority. The 1960s hippy period attempted to "overturn the machine." Although hackers appreciated technology, they wanted regular citizens, and not big corporations, to have power over technology "as a weapon that might actually undermine the authority of the expert and the hold of the monolithic system."

== The hacker ethics ==
As Levy summarized in the preface of Hackers, the general tenets or principles of hacker ethic include:

- Sharing
- Openness
- Decentralization
- Free access to computers
- World Improvement (foremost, upholding democracy and the fundamental laws we all live by, as a society)

In addition to those principles, Levy also described more specific hacker ethics and beliefs in chapter 2, The Hacker Ethic: The ethics he described in chapter 2 are:

1. "Access to computers—and anything which might teach you something about the way the world works—should be unlimited and total. Always yield to the Hands-On Imperative!"
Levy is recounting hackers' abilities to learn and build upon pre-existing ideas and systems. He believes that access gives hackers the opportunity to take things apart, fix, or improve upon them and to learn and understand how they work. This gives them the knowledge to create new and even more interesting things. Access aids the expansion of technology.
2. "All information should be free"
Linking directly with the principle of access, information needs to be free for hackers to fix, improve, and reinvent systems. A free exchange of information allows for greater overall creativity. In the hacker viewpoint, any system could benefit from an easy flow of information, a concept known as transparency in the social sciences. As Stallman notes, "free" refers to unrestricted access; it does not refer to price.
3. "Mistrust authority—promote decentralization"
The best way to promote the free exchange of information is to have an open system that presents no boundaries between a hacker and a piece of information or an item of equipment that they need in their quest for knowledge, improvement, and time on-line. Hackers believe that bureaucracies, whether corporate, government, or university, are flawed systems.
4. "Hackers should be judged by their hacking, not bogus criteria such as degrees, age, race, or position"
Inherent in the hacker ethic is a meritocratic system where superficiality is disregarded in esteem of skill. Levy articulates that criteria such as age, race, position, and qualification are deemed irrelevant within the hacker community. Hacker skill is the ultimate determinant of acceptance. Such a code within the hacker community fosters the advance of hacking and software development.
5. "You can create art and beauty on a computer"
Hackers deeply appreciate innovative techniques which allow programs to perform complicated tasks with few instructions. A program's code was considered to hold a beauty of its own, having been carefully composed and artfully arranged. Learning to create programs which used the least amount of space almost became a game between the early hackers.
6. "Computers can change your life for the better"
Hackers felt that computers had enriched their lives, given their lives focus, and made their lives adventurous. Hackers regarded computers as Aladdin's lamps that they could control. They believed that everyone in society could benefit from experiencing such power and that if everyone could interact with computers in the way that hackers did, then the hacker ethic might spread through society and computers would improve the world. The hackers succeeded in turning dreams of endless possibilities into realities. The hacker's primary object was to teach society that "the world opened up by the computer was a limitless one" (Levy 230:1984)

=== Sharing ===
From the early days of modern computing through to the 1970s, it was far more common for computer users to have the freedoms that are provided by an ethic of open sharing and collaboration. Software, including source code, was commonly shared by individuals who used computers. Most companies had a business model based on hardware sales, and provided or bundled the associated software free of charge. According to Levy's account, sharing was the norm and expected within the non-corporate hacker culture. The principle of sharing stemmed from the open atmosphere and informal access to resources at MIT. During the early days of computers and programming, the hackers at MIT would develop a program and share it with other computer users.

If the hack was deemed particularly good, then the program might be posted on a board somewhere near one of the computers. Other programs that could be built upon it and improved it were saved to tapes and added to a drawer of programs, readily accessible to all the other hackers. At any time, a fellow hacker might reach into the drawer, pick out the program, and begin adding to it or "bumming" it to make it better. Bumming referred to the process of making the code more concise so that more can be done in fewer instructions, saving precious memory for further enhancements.

In the second generation of hackers, sharing was about sharing with the general public in addition to sharing with other hackers. A particular organization of hackers that was concerned with sharing computers with the general public was a group called Community Memory. This group of hackers and idealists put computers in public places for anyone to use. The first community computer was placed outside of Leopold's Records in Berkeley, California.

Another sharing of resources occurred when Bob Albrecht provided considerable resources for a non-profit organization called the People's Computer Company (PCC). PCC opened a computer center where anyone could use the computers there for fifty cents per hour.

This second generation practice of sharing contributed to the battles of free and open software. In fact, when Bill Gates' version of BASIC for the Altair was shared among the hacker community, Gates claimed to have lost a considerable sum of money because few users paid for the software. As a result, Gates wrote an Open Letter to Hobbyists. This letter was published by several computer magazines and newsletters, most notably that of the Homebrew Computer Club where much of the sharing occurred.

According to Brent K. Jesiek in "Democratizing Software: Open Source, the Hacker Ethic, and Beyond," technology is being associated with social views and goals. Jesiek refers to Gisle Hannemyr's views on open source vs. commercialized software. Hannemyr concludes that when a hacker constructs software, the software is flexible, tailorable, modular in nature and is open-ended. A hacker's software contrasts mainstream hardware which favors control, a sense of being whole, and be immutable (Hannemyr, 1999).

Furthermore, he concludes that 'the difference between the hacker’s approach and those of the industrial programmer is one of outlook: between an agoric, integrated and holistic attitude towards the creation of artifacts and a proprietary, fragmented and reductionist one' (Hannemyr, 1999). As Hannemyr’s analysis reveals, the characteristics of a given piece of software frequently reflect the attitude and outlook of the programmers and organizations from which it emerges."

=== Copyright and patents ===
As copyright and patent laws limit the ability to share software, opposition to software patents is widespread in the hacker and free software community.

=== Hands-On Imperative ===
Many of the principles and tenets of hacker ethic contribute to a common goal: the Hands-On Imperative. As Levy described in Chapter 2, "Hackers believe that essential lessons can be learned about the systems—about the world—from taking things apart, seeing how they work, and using this knowledge to create new and more interesting things."

Employing the Hands-On Imperative requires free access, open information, and the sharing of knowledge. To a true hacker, if the Hands-On Imperative is restricted, then the ends justify the means to make it unrestricted so that improvements can be made. When these principles are not present, hackers tend to work around them. For example, when the computers at MIT were protected either by physical locks or login programs, the hackers there systematically worked around them in order to have access to the machines. Hackers assumed a "willful blindness" in the pursuit of perfection.

This behavior was not malicious in nature: the MIT hackers did not seek to harm the systems or their users. This deeply contrasts with the modern, media-encouraged image of hackers who crack secure systems in order to steal information or complete an act of cyber-vandalism.

=== Community and collaboration ===
Throughout writings about hackers and their work processes, a common value of community and collaboration is present. For example, in Levy's Hackers, each generation of hackers had geographically based communities where collaboration and sharing occurred. For the hackers at MIT, it was the labs where the computers were running. For the hardware hackers (second generation) and the game hackers (third generation) the geographic area was centered in Silicon Valley where the Homebrew Computer Club and the People's Computer Company helped hackers network, collaborate, and share their work.

The concept of community and collaboration is still relevant today, although hackers are no longer limited to collaboration in geographic regions. Now collaboration takes place via the Internet. Eric S. Raymond identifies and explains this conceptual shift in The Cathedral and the Bazaar:

Before cheap Internet, there were some geographically compact communities where the culture encouraged Weinberg's egoless programming, and a developer could easily attract a lot of skilled kibitzers and co-developers. Bell Labs, the MIT AI and LCS labs, UC Berkeley: these became the home of innovations that are legendary and still potent.

Raymond also notes that the success of Linux coincided with the wide availability of the World Wide Web. The value of community is still in high practice and use today.

== Levy's "true hackers" ==
Levy identifies several "true hackers" who significantly influenced the hacker ethic. Some well-known "true hackers" include:

- Bill Gosper: Mathematician and hacker
- Richard Greenblatt: Programmer and early designer of LISP machines
- John McCarthy: Co-founder of the MIT Artificial Intelligence Lab and Stanford AI Laboratory
- Jude Milhon: Founder of the cypherpunk movement, senior editor at Mondo 2000, and co-founder of Community Memory
- Richard Stallman: Programmer and political activist who is well known for GNU, Emacs and the Free Software Movement

Levy also identified the "hardware hackers" (the "second generation", mostly centered in Silicon Valley) and the "game hackers" (or the "third generation"). All three generations of hackers, according to Levy, embodied the principles of the hacker ethic. Some of Levy's "second-generation" hackers include:

- Steve Dompier: Homebrew Computer Club member and hacker who worked with the early Altair 8800
- John Draper: A legendary figure in the computer programming world. He wrote EasyWriter, the first word processor.
- Lee Felsenstein: A hardware hacker and co-founder of Community Memory and Homebrew Computer Club; a designer of the Sol-20 computer
- Bob Marsh: A designer of the Sol-20 computer
- Fred Moore: Activist and founder of the Homebrew Computer Club
- Steve Wozniak: One of the founders of Apple Computer

Levy's "third generation" practitioners of hacker ethic include:

- John Harris: One of the first programmers hired at On-Line Systems (which later became Sierra Entertainment)
- Ken Williams: Along with wife Roberta, founded On-Line Systems after working at IBM – the company would later achieve mainstream popularity as Sierra.

== Other descriptions ==
In 2001, Finnish philosopher Pekka Himanen promoted the hacker ethic in opposition to the Protestant work ethic. In Himanen's opinion, the hacker ethic is more closely related to the virtue ethics found in the writings of Plato and of Aristotle. Himanen explained these ideas in a book, The Hacker Ethic and the Spirit of the Information Age, with a prologue contributed by Linus Torvalds and an epilogue by Manuel Castells.

In this manifesto, the authors wrote about a hacker ethic centering on passion, hard work, creativity and joy in creating software.

== See also ==
- Hacks at the Massachusetts Institute of Technology
- Hacker (programmer subculture)
- Hacker (term)
- Hacktivism
- Tech Model Railroad Club
- The Cathedral and the Bazaar
- Free software movement
- Free software philosophy
