= Fred Moore (activist) =

American political activist

Fred Moore (1941–1997) was an American political activist who was central to the early history of the personal computer. Moore was an active member of the People's Computer Company and one of the founders of the Homebrew Computer Club, urging its members to "bring back more than you take."

Fred Moore was also active in disarmament and social justice activism, as well as nonviolent civil disobedience and direct actions. As a UC Berkeley freshman in 1959, he held a two-day hunger strike on campus against the compulsory Reserve Officers' Training Corps (ROTC) program, attracting media attention and influencing later activists of the student movement of the 1960s. After the 1980 reinstitution of draft registration in the United States, Moore became a leader in the draft resistance movement, for a time editing the newspaper, Resistance News.

Moore was a single father, raising his daughter Irene Moore, born 1968. He married Julie Kiser in 1992, and they had a daughter Mira Moore, born 1993. Moore died in an automobile accident in 1997.

Fred Moore attended the 1971 demise party for the Whole Earth Catalog. The purpose of the demise party was to decide how to give away the remaining profits from the publication of the Whole Earth Catalog, $20,000 in cash. Fred Moore eventually received the majority of the money, $14,905, after ten hours of debate and most people having left.

== Skool Resistance ==
Moore applied the politics of draft resistance to what he saw as an oppressive educational system summarised in the institution of school. In 1971 he published Skool Resistance where he said "Learning is living. If you try to separate learning from living, you end up with some artificial environment that can be defined as skool."

== Homebrew Computer Club ==
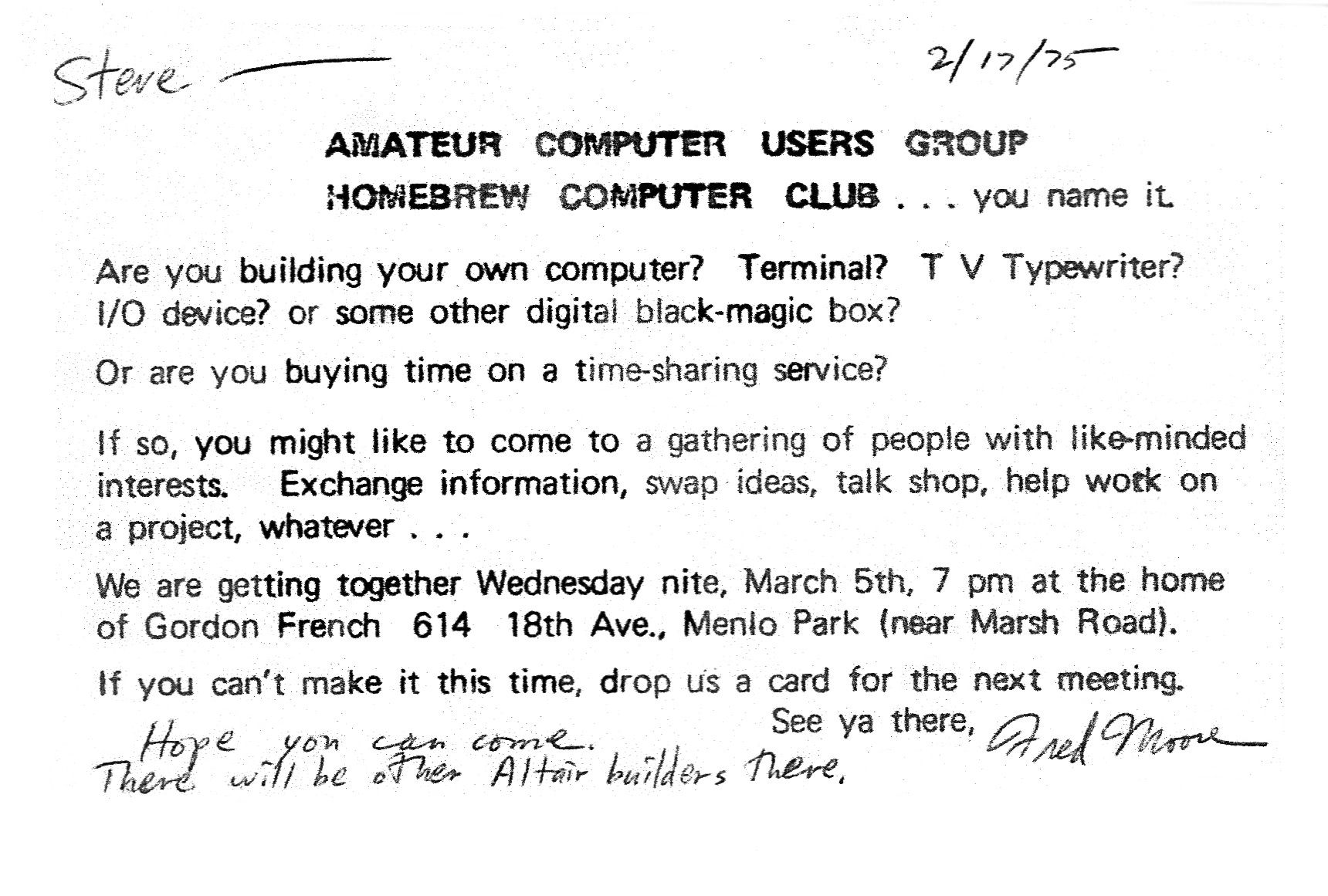
Fred Moore's invitation to the first Homebrew Computer Club meeting (sent to Steve Dompier).

Fred was co-founder with Gordon French of the Homebrew Computer Club which first met on March 5, 1975. This club was subsequently called "the crucible for an entire industry."

== In popular culture ==
Moore is prominently featured in the books What the Dormouse Said by John Markoff and Hackers: Heroes of the Computer Revolution by Steven Levy. Both highlight Moore's contribution to the democratization of the Internet and access to computer technology. Markoff wrote in 2000 that Moore's "original communitarian vision of the power of personal computers has re-emerged to challenge the computer industry's status quo, in the form of the free software movement."

== See also ==
- Walking Rainbow: Fred Moore Remembered, a film by Markley Morris
