= Medium (website) =

Online publishing platform (founded 2012)

- Company type: Privately held company
- Available in: English (specific publications can be in Spanish, French, and other languages)
- Country of origin: United States
- Area served: Worldwide
- Owner: A Medium Corporation
- Founder: Evan Williams
- Chairperson: Evan Williams
- CEO: Tony Stubblebine
- Industry: Internet
- Products: Blog; Online publication
- Services: Blog publishing system; Social network; Publisher
- Employees: 77 (July 2025)
- Website: medium.com
- Registration: Required to publish and write articles, some articles not behind the paywall are free
- Launched: August 15, 2012; 14 years ago
- Current status: Active
- Native clients on: iOS; Android

Medium is an American online publishing platform for written content such as articles and blogs, developed by Evan Williams and launched in August 2012. It is owned by A Medium Corporation. The platform is an example of social journalism, having a hybrid collection of amateur and professional people and publications, or exclusive blogs or publishers on Medium, and is regularly regarded as a blog host.

Williams, who previously co-founded Blogger and Twitter, initially developed Medium as a means to publish writings and documents longer than Twitter's then 140-character maximum.

In March 2021, Medium announced a change in its publishing strategy and business model, reducing its own publications and increasing support of independent writers.

== History ==
=== 2012–2016 ===
Evan Williams, Twitter co-founder and former CEO, created Medium to encourage users to create posts longer than the then 140-character limit of Twitter. When it launched in 2012, Williams stated, "There's been less progress toward raising the quality of what's produced."

By April 2013, Williams reported there were 30 full-time staff working on the platform, including a vacancy for a "Storyteller" role, and that it was taking "98 percent" of his time. By August, Williams reported that the site was still small, although he was still optimistic about it, saying "We are trying to make it as easy as possible for people who have thoughtful things to say".

Medium aims to optimize the time visitors spend reading the site (1.5 million hours in March 2015), as opposed to maximizing the size of its audience. In 2015, Williams criticized the standard web traffic metric of unique visitors as "a highly volatile and meaningless number for what we're trying to do". According to the company, as of May 2017, Medium.com had 60 million unique monthly readers.

Medium maintained an editorial department staffed by full-time editors and writers, had several others signed on as contractors, and served as a publisher for several publications. Matter operated from Medium Headquarters in San Francisco and was nominated for a 2015 National Magazine Award. In May 2015, Medium made deep cuts to its editorial budget forcing layoffs at dozens of publications hosted on the platform. Several publications left the platform.

In 2016, Medium acquired the rich media embedding platform Embedly, a provider of content integration services for numerous websites, including Medium itself. That same year there were 7.5 million posts published on the platform, and 60 million readers used medium.com.

In 2017, Medium introduced paywalled content accessible only to subscribers. In 2017, Medium began paying authors based on how much users expressed their appreciation for it through a like button which each user could activate multiple times. The formula for compensation was soon adapted to also include the amount of time readers spent reading, in addition to the use of the like button.

Medium has brought in revenue through native advertising and sponsorship of some article series. Medium gained several new publishers to host their content on the platform. There was an aborted attempt to introduce advertising to the site, leading to Medium cutting its staff by 50 employees in January 2017 and closing offices in New York and Washington, D.C. Williams explained that "we had started scaling up the teams to sell and support products that were, at best, incremental improvements on the ad-driven publishing model", but that, instead, Medium was aiming for a "new [business] model for writers and creators to be rewarded, based on the value they're creating for people". At that time, the company had raised $134 million in investment from venture capital firms and Williams himself.

=== 2017–present ===
In March 2017, Medium announced a membership program for $5 per month, offering access to "well-researched explainers, insightful perspectives, and useful knowledge with a longer shelf life", with authors being paid a flat amount per article. Subsequently, the sports and pop culture website The Ringer and the technology blog Backchannel, a Condé Nast publication, left Medium. Backchannel, which left Medium for Wired in June, said Medium was "no longer as focused on helping publications like ours profit."

In October 2017, Williams reaffirmed Medium was not planning to pursue banner advertising as part of their revenue model and was instead exploring micropayments, gratuities, and patronage.

In January 2021, Medium announced that it had acquired the social-based ebook company Glose. In November 2021, Medium acquired browser-based graphic design tool Projector. Projector's team joined Medium and Projector was shut down in 2022. Projector co-founder and CEO Trevor O'Brien became Medium's chief product officer. In November 2021, Medium also acquired audio-based learning platform Knowable.

Medium employees announced their intent to form a trade union with CODE-CWA in February 2021. According to the Medium Workers Union, 70% of eligible employees have signed union cards, representing workers in editorial, engineering, design and product departments. On February 11, they asked management for voluntary recognition of their union. On March 1, the company announced that the Medium Workers Union had fallen one vote short of the number needed for union recognition. During the leadup to the unionization campaign, Medium hired the union-busting firm Kauff McGuire & Margolis and the CEO Evan Williams led small discussion groups in which he urged employees not to join the union.

On July 12, 2022, the company announced that Evan Williams would be stepping down as CEO and transitioning to chairman of the board. Tony Stubblebine, chief executive of Coach.me, took over as CEO of Medium on July 20, 2022.

== User information and features ==
=== Users ===
Medium does not publish official user stats on its website. According to US blogs, the platform had about 60 million monthly visitors in 2016. In 2015, the total numbers of users was about 25 million.

=== Platform ===
The platform software provides a full WYSIWYG user interface when editing online, with various options for formatting provided as the user edits over rich text format.

Once an entry is posted, it can be recommended and shared by other people, in a similar manner to Twitter. Posts can be upvoted in a similar manner to Reddit, and content can be assigned a specific theme, in the same way as Tumblr.

In August 2017, Medium replaced their Recommend button with a "clap" feature, which readers can click multiple times (up to 50 per story) to signify how much they enjoyed the article. Medium announced that payment to authors will be weighted based on how many "claps" they receive.

Users can create a new account using a Facebook or Google account. Users may also sign up using an e-mail address, when they are signing up using the mobile app of Medium.com.

=== Memberships ===
Medium offers users subscriptions to become a member for a $5 monthly or $50 yearly fee. With a Medium membership, access to "exclusive content, audio narrations of popular stories, and an improved bookmark section" is enabled.

=== Partner Program ===
The Medium Partner Program is Medium's compensation program for its writers. Partner Program writers are paid based on how deeply Medium members read their work. As members read longer, writers earn more. Medium distributes a portion of each member's subscription fee to the writers they read most each month.

Starting from May 1, 2024, Medium banned AI-generated content from enacting paywalls and receiving payouts via Partner Program.

=== Tag system ===
Posts on Medium are sorted by topic rather than by writer, unlike most blogging platforms, including Williams' earlier Blogger. The platform uses a system of "claps" (formerly "recommendations"), similar to "likes" on Facebook, to upvote the best articles and stories, called the Tag system, and divides the stories into different categories to let the audiences choose.

=== Publications ===
"Publications" on Medium are shared spaces with a homepage on Medium's website that carry articles and blog posts, like a newspaper or magazine. The articles published or saved on it can be assigned editors, and can be saved as drafts.

- Medium acquired science and technology website Matter in 2013.
- Cuepoint, Medium's music publication, is edited by Jonathan Shecter, a music industry entrepreneur and co-founder of The Source magazine. It publishes essays on artists, trends, and releases, written by Medium community contributors, major record executives, and music journalists, including Robert Christgau, who contributed his Expert Witness capsule review column. Cuepoint was started in 2014.
- Medium also published a technology publication called Backchannel, edited by Steven Levy. In 2016, Backchannel was purchased by Condé Nast.

In 2016, Medium hired the founder of the publication Human Parts, which focused on personal stories.

On February 23, 2016, it was announced that Medium had reached a deal to host the new Bill Simmons website, The Ringer. In August 2017, it left Medium for Vox Media.

In 2019, Medium acquired Bay Area website The Bold Italic. Also in 2019, Medium launched seven new publications: GEN (politics, power, and culture), OneZero (tech and science), Marker (business), Elemental (health and wellness), Focus (productivity), Zora (women of color) and Level (men of color).

In 2020, Medium launched Momentum, whose subjects are anti-racism and civil rights.

== Board and corporate governance ==
=== Board members ===
As of June 2020, Medium's board members were:

- Evan Williams
- Biz Stone
- Josh Elman of Greylock Partners
- Ben Horowitz
- Colin Kaepernick

=== Former use of holacracy ===
Medium initially used holacracy as its structure of corporate governance. In 2016, they moved away from holacracy because they reported difficulty coordinating large-scale projects, dissatisfaction with the required record-keeping, and poor public perception of holacracy. (Note: For difficulties in coordination between departments in the corporate structure, see Bort (2017).)

== Reception ==
Reviewing the service at its launch in 2012, The Guardian enjoyed some of the collections that had been created, particularly a collection of nostalgic photographs created by Williams. TechCrunch's Drew Olanoff suggested the platform might have taken its name from being a "medium"-sized platform in between Twitter and full-scale blogging platforms such as Blogger.

Lawrence Lessig welcomed the platform's affordance of Creative Commons licensing for user content, a feature demonstrated in a Medium project with The Public Domain Review—an interactive online edition of Alice's Adventures In Wonderland, annotated by a dozen Carroll scholars, allowing free remixes of the public domain and Creative Commons licensed text and art resources, with reader-supplied commentaries and artwork.

However, in 2013 the service suffered criticism from writers, with some confused about exactly what it is expected to provide.

A 2019 Nieman Lab article chronicling Medium's first seven years described the site as having "undergone countless pivots", becoming "an endless thought experiment into what publishing on the internet could look like".

== Government censorship of Medium ==
=== Malaysia ===
In January 2016, Medium received a take-down notice from the Malaysian Communications and Multimedia Commission (MCMC) for one of the articles published by the Sarawak Report. The Sarawak Report had been hosting its articles on Medium since July 2015, when its own website was blocked by the Malaysian government. It had reported allegations that money linked to a state investment fund, 1Malaysia Development Berhad (1MDB), ended up in Prime Minister Najib Razak's bank accounts.

Medium's legal team responded to the commission with a request for a copy of the Malaysian Anti-Corruption Commission's official statement that the post was untrue, for information on which parts of the article were found false, and for information on whether the dispute has been raised in court. The site declined to take the content down until directed to do so by an order from a court of competent jurisdiction. In response, on January 27, 2016, all content on Medium was made unavailable for Internet users in Malaysia.

The ban has been lifted as of May 18, 2018, with the MCMC stating the ban lift was because "there was no reason (to block the website)" as the 1MDB report has been made public by the government.

=== Egypt ===
As of June 2017, Medium has been blocked in Egypt along with more than 60 media websites in a crackdown by the Egyptian government. The list of blocked sites also includes Al Jazeera, The Huffington Post's Arabic website and Mada Masr. Medium was made available again as of November 2022.

=== China ===
In April 2016, Medium was blocked in mainland China after information from the leaked Panama Papers was published on the site.

=== Albania ===
The Albanian Audiovisual Media Authority blocked Medium in Albania from April 19–21, 2020.

=== Vietnam ===
By the end of 2020, Medium was reported to have been blocked by some ISPs in Vietnam.

=== Russia ===
Roskomnadzor blocked the Medium website and all its subdomains in the Russian Federation on May 31, 2023.

== Software architecture ==
Medium's initial technology stack relied on a variety of AWS services including EC2, S3, and CloudFront. Originally, it was written in Node.js and the text editor that Medium users wrote blog posts with was based on TinyMCE. As of 2017, the blogging platform's technology stack included AWS services, including EBS, RDS for Aurora, and Route 53; its image server was written in Go, and the main app servers were still written in Node.

== See also ==
- Substack
