= Leonard Wolf =

Romanian-American writer, teacher, and translator (1923–2019)

- Born: March 01, 1923; Vulcan Romania
- Died: March 20, 2019 (aged 96); Corvallis, Oregon US
- Occupations: poet, author, teacher, and translator

Leonard Wolf (March 1, 1923 – March 20, 2019) was a Romanian-American poet, author, teacher, and translator. He is known for his authoritative annotated editions of classic gothic horror novels, including Dracula, Frankenstein, The Strange Case of Dr Jekyll and Mr Hyde, and The Phantom of the Opera, and other critical works on the topic; and also for his Yiddish translations of works ranging from those of Isaac Bashevis Singer to Winnie-the-Pooh. He was the father of Naomi Wolf.

== Life and career ==
Born in Vulcan, Romania (Transylvania), (Note: The birthplace may be Vulcan, Brașov or Vulcan, Hunedoara.) Wolf was originally named 'Ludovic', which was changed upon his arrival in the United States in 1930 with his mother, Rose-ita, older brother, Maxim (Mel) and younger sister, Shirly. He wrote and published numerous poems, short stories, book reviews and articles, and was part of the Berkeley Renaissance of the late 1940s and 1950s. He was a professor of English at San Francisco State University (SFSU) until moving to New York around 1980, focussing on teaching poetry. He is the author of several books including A Dream of Dracula, Blood Thirst, 100 Years of Vampire Fiction (editor), Bluebeard : The Life and Crimes of Gilles De Rais, Doubles, Dummies and Dolls : Twenty-One Terror Tales of Replication (editor), Dracula : the Connoisseur's Guide, False Messiah, Horror - A Connoisseur's Guide To Literature And Film, Monsters: Twenty Terrible and Wonderful Beasts From The Classic Dragon And Colossal Minotaur To King Kong And The Great Godzilla, Quiromancia/ Chiromancy, The False Messiah, Voices from the love generation (Little, Brown, 1968), The Glass Mountain: A Novel (Overlook Press, 1993), The Passion of Israel [By] Leonard Wolf. Interviews Taken and Edited in Collaboration with Deborah Wolf, Wolf's Complete Book of Terror (editor), and Vini-Der-Pu: A Yiddish version of Winnie the Pooh (Dutton 2000).

Wolf lived in New York. He was commissioned by Farrar, Straus & Giroux to write a biography of Isaac Bashevis Singer.

The Treehouse: Eccentric Wisdom from My Father on How to Live, Love and See, by his daughter Naomi was published by Simon & Schuster in 2005.

He died on March 20, 2019, in Corvallis, Oregon.

He is also credited as a technical advisor in Francis Ford Coppola's 1992 movie Bram Stoker's Dracula.

=== Happening House ===
While teaching at San Francisco State University in 1967, Wolf founded Happening House, one of many organizations that originated with the hippies of the Haight Ashbury district. It was conceived as an alternate university, an arts center and a place of learning. It often planned and sponsored social events such as softball games and free concerts. In collaboration with the Haight Ashbury Switchboard it had intermittent connections with the Haight Ashbury Free Clinic.
