= Whole Earth Access =

American retailer

- Type: Private subsidiary
- Founded: Berkeley, California U.S. (1969)
- Defunct: 1998
- Fate: Shuttered
- Headquarters: 2950 7th Street, Berkeley, California 94710 U.S.

Whole Earth Access (1969–1998) started as a countercultural retail store in Berkeley, California. In the early 1990s, Whole Earth Access had seven stores in Northern California. After filing for bankruptcy in 1996, all stores closed in 1998.

== History ==
The Whole Earth Catalog was preceded by the "Whole Earth Truck Store", a 1963 Dodge truck. In 1968, the "Truck Store" finally settled into its permanent location in Menlo Park, California.

In 1969, a store that was inspired by (but not financially connected with) the Whole Earth Catalog, called Whole Earth Access opened in Berkeley. The store had the Leopold's Records Teletype Model 33 ASR which connected to the Community Memory Project SDS 940 mainframe computer.

In 1978, two brothers, Larry and Gene Farb bought the Berkeley store on Shattuck avenue. The first store, located in an industrial area of Berkeley, sold various brand names sought after by young affluents at a discounted price. Salespersons were technology-savvy and knowledgeable of their products. Gene Farb managed electronics and photographic merchandise, Larry Farb managed hardware and appliances, Laura Katz (Larry's wife) ran the housewares and clothing departments, and Toni Garrett (Gene's wife) handled book sales and mail order. The store also built some of the computers it was selling, The second store opened in Marin County in 1982, and the third in San Francisco in 1985.

According to a 1985 issue of the store's Whole Earth Access Mail Order Catalog, (named after, but not connected to the Whole Earth Catalog which it also sold):

Our Berkeley store opened in 1969, inspired by but independent of the Whole Earth Catalog. It began by carrying books, a few woodstoves, a few power tools, and back-to-the-land equipment. Access to a wide variety of products was available at very low prices through special ordering from distributors' catalogs. Gradually the store began stocking the items most commonly ordered, and we now carry a wide range of top-quality products for basic living, still at very low prices. Our newest section is electronics and communications, which includes cameras, video, audio, and computers.

Larry Farb commented in 1986 to the Los Angeles Times that, "we've grown up with our customers [...] the person who bought wood stoves in the 1970s is buying cappuccino makers today."

In the early 1990s, the company opened four more stores in Northern California, contracting debts to finance the expansion. In 1992, its sales peaked at US$180 million.

In 1995, the San Jose and Concord stores were closed. In 1996, Basic Living Products, the parent company of Whole Earth Access, closed the Foster City and Sacramento stores, and filed for bankruptcy protection.

In November 1998, the three first and last stores of Whole Earth Access (Berkeley, San Rafael, and San Francisco) went out of business. Co-founder Gene Farb died three years later, in 2001.
