= Liza Loop =

American writer

Liza Loop (née Straus) is an educational technology pioneer, futurist, technical author, and consultant. She is notable for her early use of computers in education, her 1975 creation of the public-access computer center known as LO*OP Center, Inc, consulting work with Atari, Inc., Apple, Radio Shack and others as well as philosophical musings on the future of learning environments from the 1970s on.

== Early life ==
Loop was raised in Massachusetts and attended Dana Hall; her mother was a science teacher at Dana Hall and her father was an engineer at the Massachusetts Institute of Technology. Loop attended Cornell University starting in 1963, and later Sonoma State University's graduate school where she was influenced by Stanford University psychologist Dean Brown.

== Career ==
In 1975, Loop joined the Homebrew Computer Club and was among the first women to join the club. She founded the LO*OP Center (Learning Options * Open Portal) non-profit organization which was the second public access computer center located outside a museum. After visiting the center, Apple co-founder Steve Wozniak was impressed enough with her work that he gave her an original Apple I computer to use in her center and at the Windsor Junior High School. For most of 1976 the center's Apple I was the only Apple I in the North Bay.

In 1978, when Atari was developing the Atari 800 home computer, Loop was brought in as a consultant to help meet the market for home computers that children and adults could use for learning. She wrote the original Operator's Manuals for the Atari 400 and 800.

The Liza Loop Papers from 1972 to 1984 (donated in 1986) are housed in Stanford University Libraries' manuscript division and detail the early years of educational computing. (Note: According to a wiki page by Liza Loop , Loop donated several boxes of magazines and papers from LO*OP Center's collection to the Computer History Museum. As of 2014, that half remained unindexed.)

In the early 21st century, she became an advocate of preserving the early history of computing in education.

== Bibliography ==
- Loop, L. (1977). Sharing Your Computer Hobby with Kids, presented at the First West Coast Computer Faire Conference and Proceedings, Palo Alto, CA, The Computer Faire, 1977
- Loop, Liza; Christensen, Paul (Nov 1980). Exploring the Microcomputer Learning Environment, Report #5, Independent Research and Development Project Reports (PDF). San Francisco, California: Far West Laboratory for Educational Research and Development.
- Loop, Liza; Anton, Julia; Zamora, Ramon (1982). ComputerTown. A Do-It-Yourself Community Computer Project (PDF). Menlo Park, California: People's Computer Company.
- Loop, L. (1983). Operation Education Anywhere - How Computer Networking could change Our Concept of School. Alberta Printout, Edmonton, Alberta, Canada, Alberta Society for Computers in Education, 4(3), p. 25.
- Loop, Liza; Anton, Julie; Zamora, Ramon (1983). ComputerTown, bringing computer literacy to your community. Reston, Va.: Reston Pub. Co. ISBN 9780835908849. OCLC 9324057.
- Loop, L., Arias, B. (1986). Technology and the Education of Hispanics: The Promise and the Dilemma -- A Policy Report, The Tomas Rivera Center, Claremont, CA.
- Carnoy, M., & Loop, L. (1986). Computers and Education: Which Role for International Research? Proceedings of the Stanford/UNESCO Symposium (Stanford, California, March 10-14, 1986).
- Loop, L. (1987). Open Portal Schools: The Real Impact of Computer-Based Education. White paper, LO*OP Center, Inc., Palo Alto, CA.
- Loop, L. (2006, July). Why Look Back? Arguments for a History of Computing in Education. In Sixth IEEE International Conference on Advanced Learning Technologies (ICALT'06) (pp. 1087-1088). IEEE.
- Ferilli, S., Loop, L., Rankin, W., Trafford, P. (2021). Introducing KEPLAIR – A Platform for Independent Learners. In L.G. Chova, A.L. Martinez, I.C. Torres (Eds.), Proceedings of the 13th International Conference on Education and New Learning Technologies (EDULEARN 2021), 9638-9647, Palma, Spain, July 5-6, IATED Academy.
- Redavid, D., Ferilli, S., Loop, L., & Matviichuk, L. (2022). Emotional States Management for an Advanced Intelligent Tutoring System. In Proceedings of the 14th International Joint Conference on Knowledge Discovery, Knowledge Engineering and Knowledge Management (IC3K 2022) - Volume 2: KEOD
- Ferilli, S., Redavid, D., Di Pierro, D., Loop, L. (2022). An Ontology-driven Architecture for Intelligent Tutoring Systems - with an Application to Learning Object Recommendation. International Journal of Computer Information Systems and Industrial Management Applications (IJCISIM), Machine Intelligence Research Labs. 2022.14(297-312)
- Ferilli, S., Redavid, D., Di Pierro, D., Loop, L. (2022). Functionality and Architecture for a Platform for Independent Learners: KEPLAIR. In A. Abraham, N. Gandhi, T. Hanne, T. Hong, T. N. Rios, W. Ding (Eds.) Intelligent systems design and Applications (pp. 795-805). Springer.
- Ferilli, S., & Loop, L. (2022, February). Toward Reasoning-based Recommendation of Library Items—A Case Study on the e-Learning Domain. In Central Europe (CEUR) Workshop Proceedings, Proceedings of the 18th Italian Research Conference on Digital Libraries (IRCDL 2022), Padova, Italy (pp. 24-25).
