= Pekka Himanen =

Finnish philosopher (born 1973)

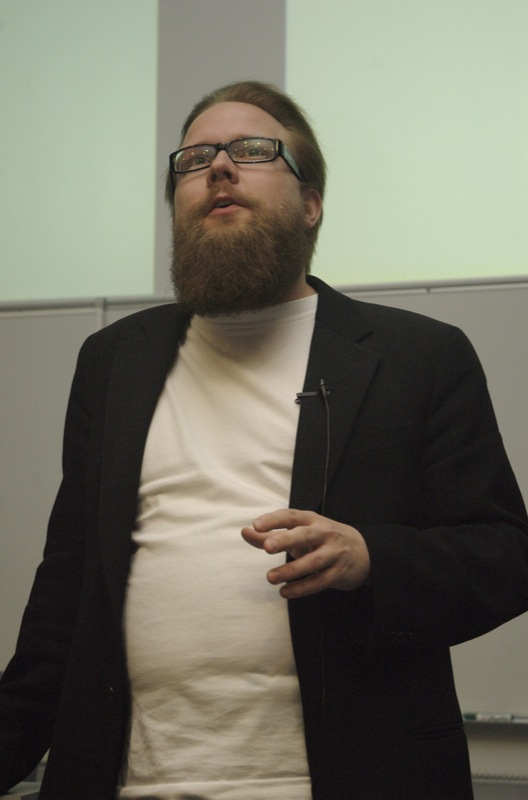
Himamen in 2016

Pekka Himanen (born 19 October 1973) is a Finnish philosopher.

== Professional career ==
Pekka Himanen studied philosophy (and computer science as a minor) at the University of Helsinki, under professor Esa Saarinen. In 1994, with his thesis on the philosophy of religion, The challenge of Bertrand Russell, he received his Ph.D. in philosophy from the same university, breaking the record as the youngest person to obtain a PhD in Finland, following other record-breaking young PhDs supervised by Saarinen.

He has done research work in Finland (University of Helsinki), the United Kingdom (University of Oxford), and the United States (Stanford University, University of California, Berkeley). At UC Berkeley, Himanen directed the Berkeley Center for the Information Society, a research group under Berkeley's International Computer Science Institute. The Center was active from September 2002 until 2005.

Himanen has been a counselor to the president of Finland, Finnish government (including the Ministry of Education) and Finnish parliament, in the field of information society.

He was a visiting professor at the Oxford Internet Institute (based at Oxford University) from September 2005 to July 2006.

Himanen had multiple appointments as a fixed-term part-time professor at Helsinki School of Art and Design (now part of Aalto University as Aalto University School of Arts, Design and Architecture) from 2008 until 2014.

== Writings ==
In his book HimEros written as a dialogue, Socrates’ wife Xanthippe relates to the Helsinkian what happened to Socrates in Hades, how Socrates decided to escape from Hades and go to study philosophy at the University of Helsinki, and how he was arrested, sentenced to death and executed as a result of a three-day conversation with the philosophers of the University. Xanthippe also transmits Socrates’ dialogue with the university teachers of philosophy Cyborg (Stephen Hawking), Pope (John Paul II), Unabomber (Theodore Kaczynski) and Madonna (Madonna Ciccone).

In The Hacker Ethic and the Spirit of the Information Age, Himanen is trying to understand the core of informationalism, the post-industrialist paradigm, extending the ideas of Manuel Castells' Information Age. As an alternative to the industrial-capitalist protestant work ethic he proposes a hacker ethic as something like a cyber communitarianism. The structure of the information society is a web, which in contemporary business world manifests itself, for instance, in dynamic outsourcing and even cooperation with one's competitors. The "knots" of such a web get activated according to the needs and opportunities.

== Global Dignity ==
In 2006, he established Global Dignity with Haakon, Crown Prince of Norway and John Hope Bryant. Global Dignity is an independent, non-political organization that promotes the universal right of every human being to lead a dignified life.

== Criticism and negative publicity ==
Two Finnish journalists, Anu Silfverberg and Johanna Vehkoo, published a critical investigation of Himanen's research funding from public sources, the outcomes of his research, as well as his use of the title of "professor" without holding a professorship. The investigation followed the critical reception of Himanen's recent research reports on information society done under contract with the Finnish government, and reports of disorderly conduct in public places while intoxicated.

== Books ==
- HimEros (1996)
- Filosofian oikeudenkäynti (The trial of philosophy, 1998)
- The Hacker Ethic and the Spirit of the Information Age (foreword by Linus Torvalds, afterword by Manuel Castells, 2001)
- Manuel Castells and Pekka Himanen. The Information Society and the Welfare State: The Finnish Model (2002)
- Challenges of the Global Information Society, report for the Committee for the Future in Parliament of Finland (2004). https://web.archive.org/web/20041114013607/http://www.eduskunta.fi/efakta/vk/tuv/challenges_of_the_globalinformationsociety.pdf
- Rakkaus (Love) to appear (2004).

== Awards ==
- 1994 Finnish State Award for Popular Science (for the talk series Joulukalenteri (Christmas Calendar))
- 1998 European multimedia award Europrix for the CD Sokrates (Socrates)
