= Haight-Ashbury Switchboard =

Former organization in San Francisco, USA

During the Summer of Love in San Francisco, an individual named Al Rinker started an organization located at 1830 Fell St in the city's Haight Ashbury district called the Switchboard. Its purpose was to act as a social switchboard for people living there.

== History ==
In early 1967 the Diggers were promoting a new type of philosophy and life concept in the Haight Ashbury. With the increase in media coverage of the district, a local resident, Al Rinker, was able to see the need for a service that would provide news and information about the hippie movement in the area. At the beginning of 1967, he rented an apartment on 1830 Fell Street just across the street from Golden Gate Park's Panhandle in order to function as both his home and the headquarters of his conceptual "Switchboard" concept. As a result of Rinker's concept of a human switchboard, George Darling and Danny were willing to assist him in the creation of it.

While he and the volunteers were doing this, the "Human Be In" took place and the Fillmore Auditorium was gaining national prominence. There has been a significant increase in the amount of coverage that has been given to the Haight Ashbury, bringing in more people and making it more difficult to run the Switchboard.

Rinker did not initially consider how some of the services that would be needed as a direct result of the rapid influx of people in the area would be needed. Among the things they had to do was find safe lodging (Crash Pads) for the wandering jobless hippies who arrived in the city without any means of support whatsoever. As a result of the popularity of this program, Rinker's office (living room) was remodeled to serve as the "We will help you find a place to stay" room. In an attempt to save space, Al moved his office from the kitchen to a tiny room next to it. In order to be able to accomplish the many tasks that the Switchboard wanted to accomplish, the Switchboard attracted additional volunteers Ron Small and Ken Englander.

In the midst of the population explosion, social networking took a back seat to more important services required to support the growing population. In summary, the Switchboard was created, then made useful by events not originally considered, and grew to fill these needs, as well as those in its original plan.

== Social events 1967–1968 ==
- Music concert – on August 15, 1967, Happening House planned an arts and crafts fair followed by a free live concert in the Panhandle. About 15 bands were to perform, however, the police would not issue a permit for the live music portion of the fair. The Switchboard and Happening House then jointly sponsored a live music concert at Sokel Hall on Page Street as a follow-up to the fair.
- Softball Games – as a fund raising activity, the Switchboard formed a softball team
  - During July 1967, there was a radio broadcast game that took place between the Switchboard and the KNEW radio staff. In addition, a bevy of Playboys "bunnies" were promised by Playboy magazine to also be taking part. There were enough players from the Switchboard and KNEW to make the game possible, but none of the bunnies showed up to play.
  - In August 1967, the Switchboard played its second and last game against Happening House. This received TV news coverage but notes from the game do not mention on which TV station(s). They do mention the game was won by the Switchboard by a score of 28-16.
- The infamous cocktail party—In the heyday of the 1967 summer, Al and Ron Small were invited to speak on a local radio talk show. From ideas sown during that broadcast, it was decided to have a cocktail party that would be attended by both the "straights" (political figures, newspaper figures, authoritarian figures like the police) and the "Hips" (founders and invited staff of (1) the Psychedelic Shop (Ron Thelin and his brother Jay Thelin), (2) the Switchboard (Al Rinker, George Darling, and many others), (3)The Diggers, (4)The Free Clinic (Dr. David E. Smith) and other organizations active in the "Hip scene"). Al was contacted by someone calling himself Herb who professed to be a journalist. Herb wanted to provide monetary support for the party in exchange for interviews with Al and others at the Switchboard. He wrote Al a check for $1500.00 not an insignificant sum at that time. The money went toward loads of booze and some party food (no drugs). John Shelley the Mayor of San Francisco and Herb Caen a popular journalist at the San Francisco Chronicle (not the Herb above) both made appearances and the free flowing alcohol made for a lot of camaraderie. But not much came of the event except that the check Al had been given bounced and Herb disappeared after the party. While this was not the only reason, the Switchboard began to change. Al had financial problems and the mood of the Haight itself had changed.
- In late September 1967, many of the shops in the district began to display a stack of 4×5 cards on their counters proclaiming "Funeral Notice for Hippie". "Friends are invited to attend services beginning at sunrise, October 6, 1967 at Buena Vista Park". Al actively supported the funeral concept. Al and many of the original Digger group had realized that the media had exploited the word "Hippie" to have a or be a negative concept and decided to have a funeral to end the negative connotation that had become attached to the word. The media once again twisted the purpose of the event and broadcast the story nationwide calling it "The Death of the Hippie" without explaining the true purpose of the procession. During the days preceding the event, Al Rinker described the event as the beginning of the end. Ron Thelin gave away everything in the Psychedelic Shop to the customers who came in. The funeral procession went from the park down Haight St and ended in the Panhandle. Ron (of the Switchboard) was one of the pallbearers carrying a trinket filled casket. It was emblematic of the fate of the hippie movement and of the Switchboard. The Psychedelic Shop closed for good right after the funeral. The Switchboard lingered on but withered. Al left for more remote northern territories in 1970.

== Later period ==
After the departure of Al Rinker, Ken Englander and others took up the Switchboard concept. They moved to a storefront office at 1797 Haight St]. It went through a number of moves and forum changes through the 1990s.

Before he left, Rinker transferred the Haight Ashbury Switchboard's 501 (c)(3) (non profit tax status) to Pam Hardt and Jed Riffe. They changed the name to Resource One and moved it into Project One.

== Aftermath ==
- Al Rinker died in May 2003. He wrote a book about the entire Haight Ashbury experience called Beyond Haight, which was never published.
- Ron Small continues to be involved with charitable projects for runaways and other youth programs.
- Ken Englander (a Vietnam veteran), George, Danny, and all the other volunteers from that brief period have vanished more successfully than Hippie.
- JoAnn Silverstein is a professor of Civil, Environmental, and Architectural Engineering in the Environmental Engineering Dept of the University Of Colorado, Boulder.
- Ron Thelin moved to the San Geronimo Valley in Marin County, California. He died in 1996.
- Jay Thelin became president of the Thelin Company, which makes wood pellet-burning heaters. He sold the company in 2009 and retired.

== Pictures ==
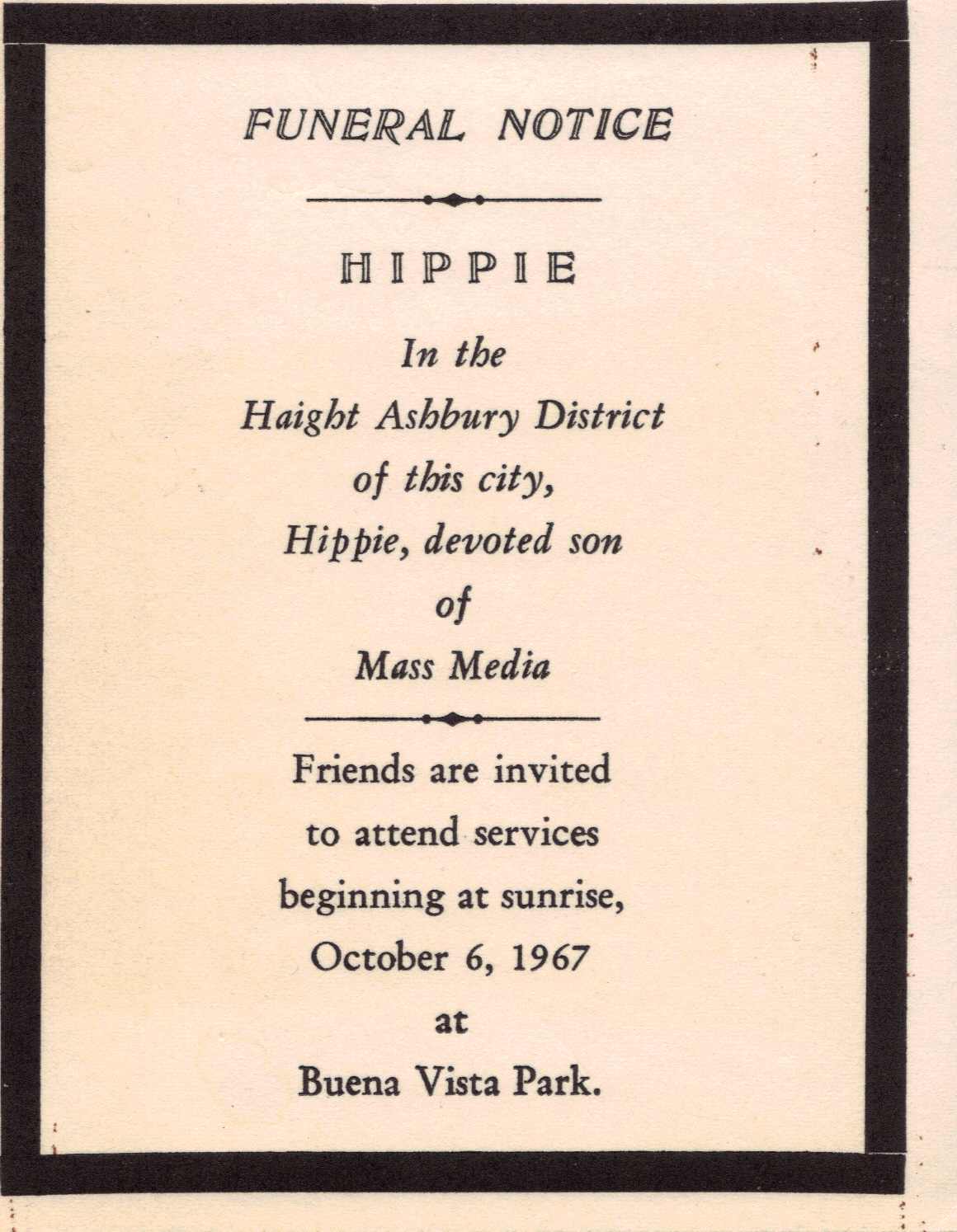
The Hippie Funeral Notice

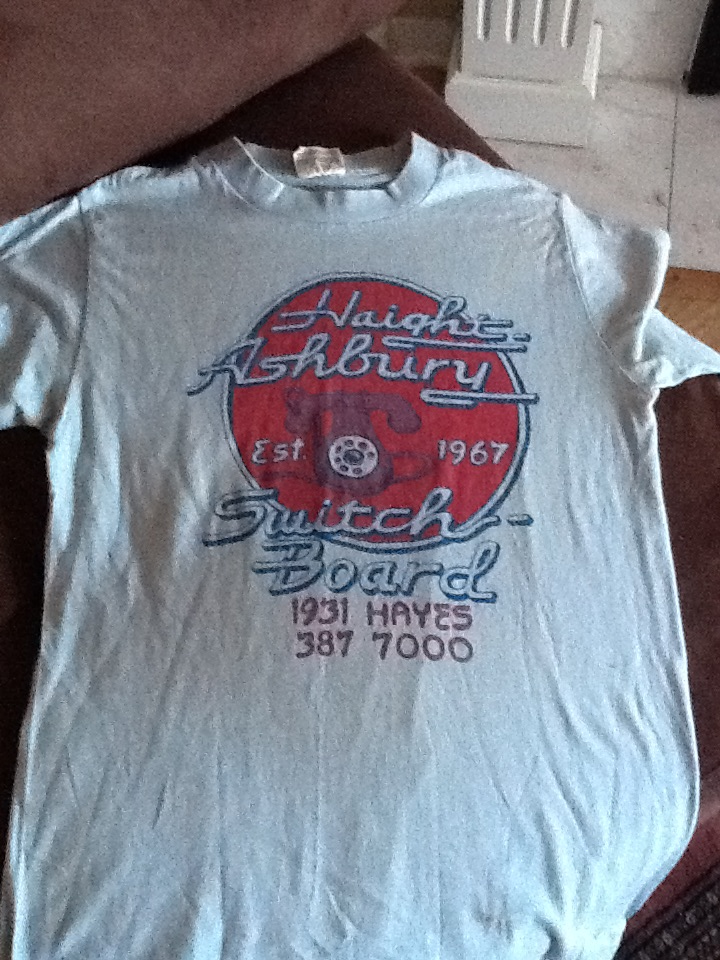
Switchboard T-Shirt 1976

== Footnotes and other references ==
Other references

- "The Summer of Love" PBS video narrated by Peter Coyote
- The Haight Ashbury - A History by Charles Perry Random House 1984 ISBN 0-394-41098-X
  - Pg 126 Reference to the Switchboard and Crash Pads
  - Pg 143 Reference to the 1967 Concert
  - Pg 150 Reference to the debt after the cocktail party
  - Pg 177 Reference to the Switchboard after the departure of Al Rinker
- The Treehouse Naomi Wolf's recollections about her father Leonard Wolf and a reference to Happening House
- Year of the heroic guerrilla By Robert Vincent Daniels, contains references to the Switchboard, Happening House, the Diggers etc
- Special Report on the Haight-Ashbury district of San Francisco featuring Ron Thelin of the Diggers
