= Pamela Hardt-English =

American food scientist and computer scientist

- Education: University of California, Berkeley and University of California, Davis
- Known for: Creating Resource One, a so-called "people's computing center" at Project One in San Francisco
- Scientific career
- Fields: Computer science, Food science
- Workplaces: FMC Corporation, PhF Specialists

Pamela Hardt-English is an American food scientist and computer scientist who created Resource One, a "people's computing center" in 1972 at Project One, a "technological commune" in San Francisco, California.

== Education ==
Pamela Hardt-English was a graduate student in computer science at the University of California, Berkeley. She left the computer science program in 1970 in protest against the American incursion into Cambodia. As she noted, "I dropped out of school because I decided that I spent too much time preparing to do stuff and not enough time actually doing anything."

== Resource One ==
Hardt-English joined Project One, a live-work community (sometimes referred to as a "technological commune"), conceptualized around Symbas School — an alternative high school — and housed in a multistory former factory building in San Francisco, in 1970. In 1972, she arranged for the delivery of a decommissioned SDS 940, a mainframe computer, to the commune, establishing Resource One. Resource One's goal was to link together the centers of counterculture across the Bay Area with a computer network.

== Career ==
After leaving Project One, Hardt-English received master's degrees in agricultural engineering and food science from the University of California, Davis. She is currently the president of PhF Specialists, Inc. in San Jose, California.
