= Esa Saarinen =

Finnish philosopher (born 1953)

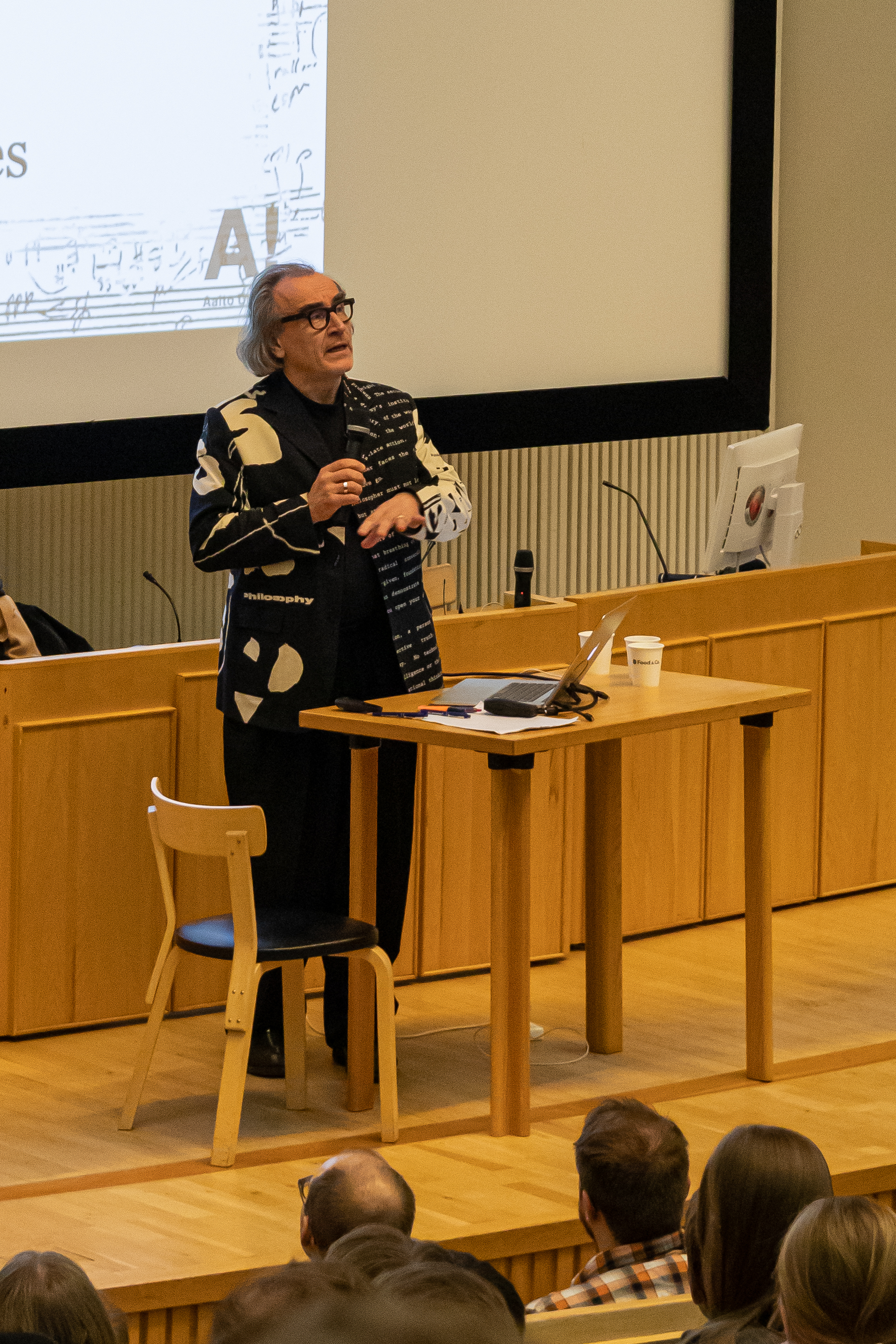
Esa Saarinen giving a lecture at the Aalto University in January 2020

Esa Jouni Olavi Saarinen (born 27 July 1953 in Hyvinkää, Finland) is a Finnish philosopher who was a professor of applied philosophy at Aalto University and co-director of the Systems Intelligence Research Group, until his retirement in 2021.

Saarinen completed his PhD degree in 1978 at the University of Helsinki, where he has since held a docentship. His extrovert public persona – he became known as the “punk doctor” – was reflected in his lectures at the university, which drew increasingly large audiences until the late 1990s. After failing to get the position of full-time professor at the Department of Philosophy at the University of Helsinki, Saarinen resigned from his lecturer position. Soon afterwards he was appointed professor at Helsinki University of Technology, since then renamed Aalto University.

Saarinen's philosophical interests have changed dramatically, from early writings in formal logic, to concerns with existentialism and later to media philosophy. The year 1994 saw the publication of Saarinen's best-known non-academic work, Imagologies: Media Philosophy, written jointly with American philosopher Mark C. Taylor.

In addition to academic teaching, Saarinen has also continued his business as a coach for Finnish companies and organisations, promoting a doctrine of self-actualization.

Saarinen is married to Pipsa Pallasvesa and has two sons, Jerome and Oliver, born in 1989.

One of Esa Saarinen's former students is the philosopher Pekka Himanen.

Esa Saarinen was stabbed with a knife by a student outside a lecture hall in March 2014. He survived without life-threatening injuries.

== Articles ==
- Philosophy for Managers 2008
