= Homebrew Computer Club =

Computer hobbyist users' group in California

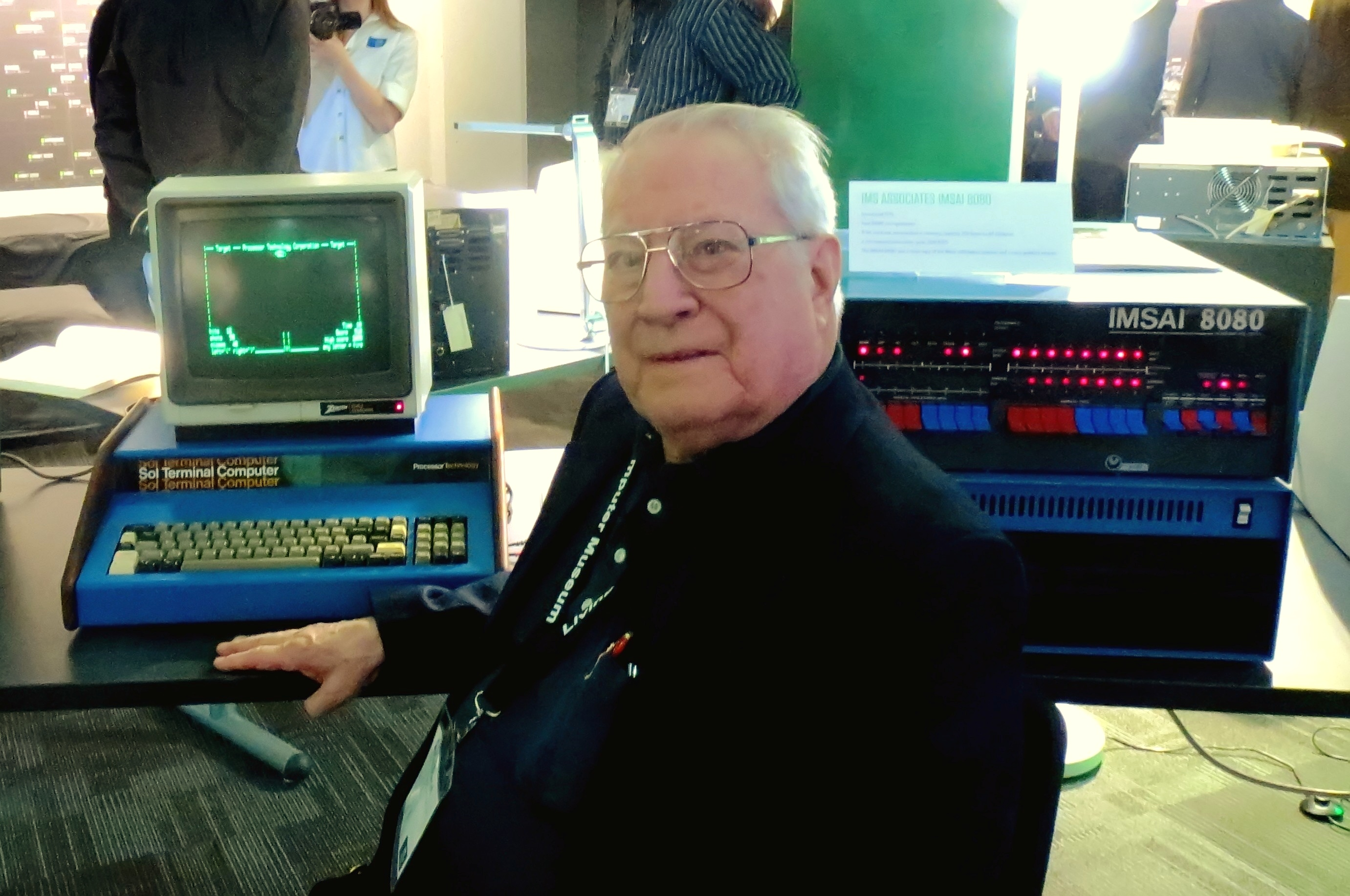
Gordon French, co-founder of the Homebrew Computer Club, photographed at the Living Computer Museum in 2013. He hosted the first meeting of the club in his garage, in March 1975.

The Homebrew Computer Club was an early computer hobbyist group in Menlo Park, California, which met from March 1975 to December 1986. The club had an influential role in the development of the microcomputer revolution and the rise of that aspect of the Silicon Valley information technology industrial complex.

Several high-profile hackers and computer entrepreneurs emerged from its ranks, including Steve Jobs and Steve Wozniak, the founders of Apple Computer. With its newsletter and monthly meetings promoting an open exchange of ideas, the club has been described as "the crucible for an entire industry" as it pertains to personal computing.

== History ==
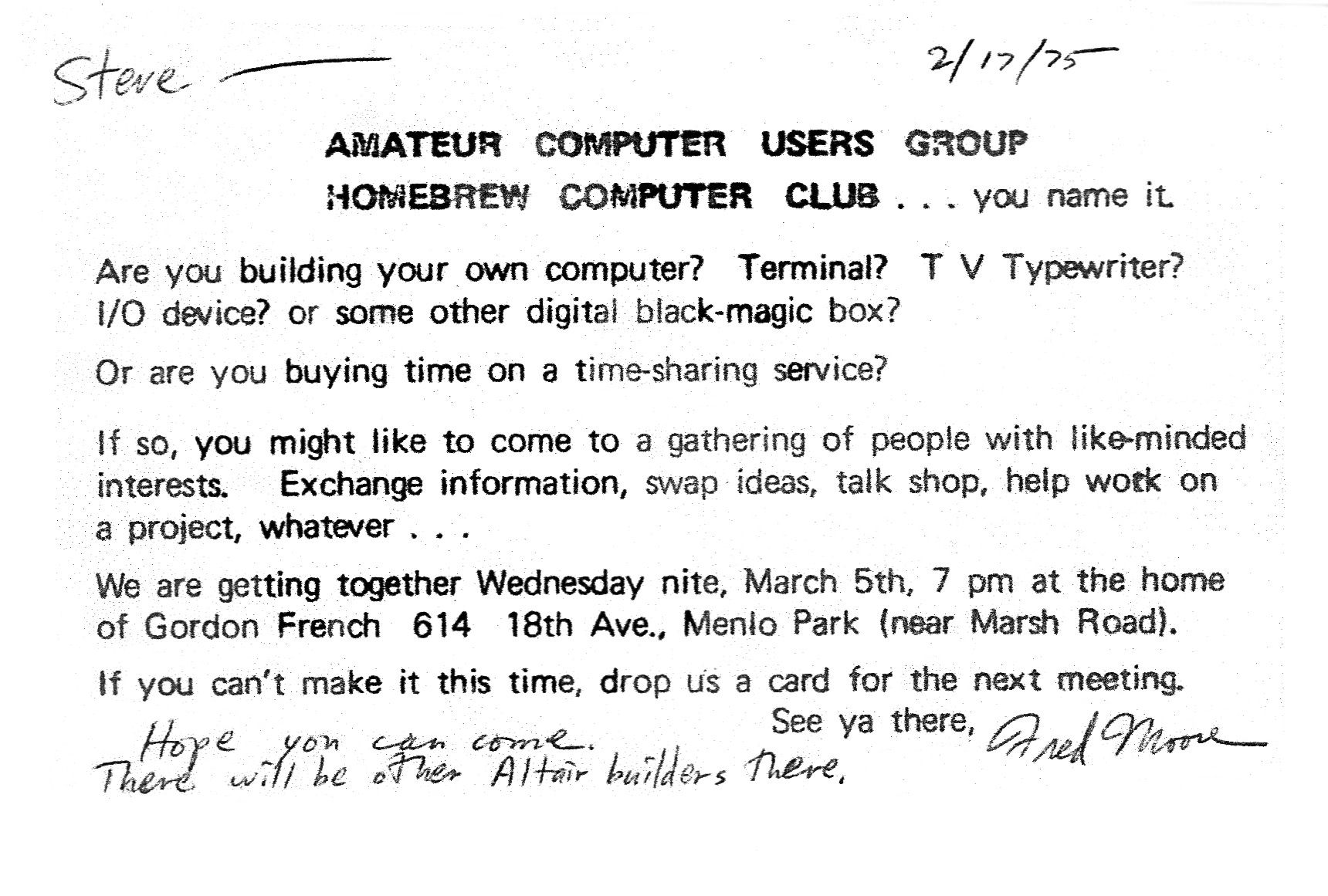
Invitation to first Homebrew Computer Club meeting, sent by Fred Moore to Steve Dompier

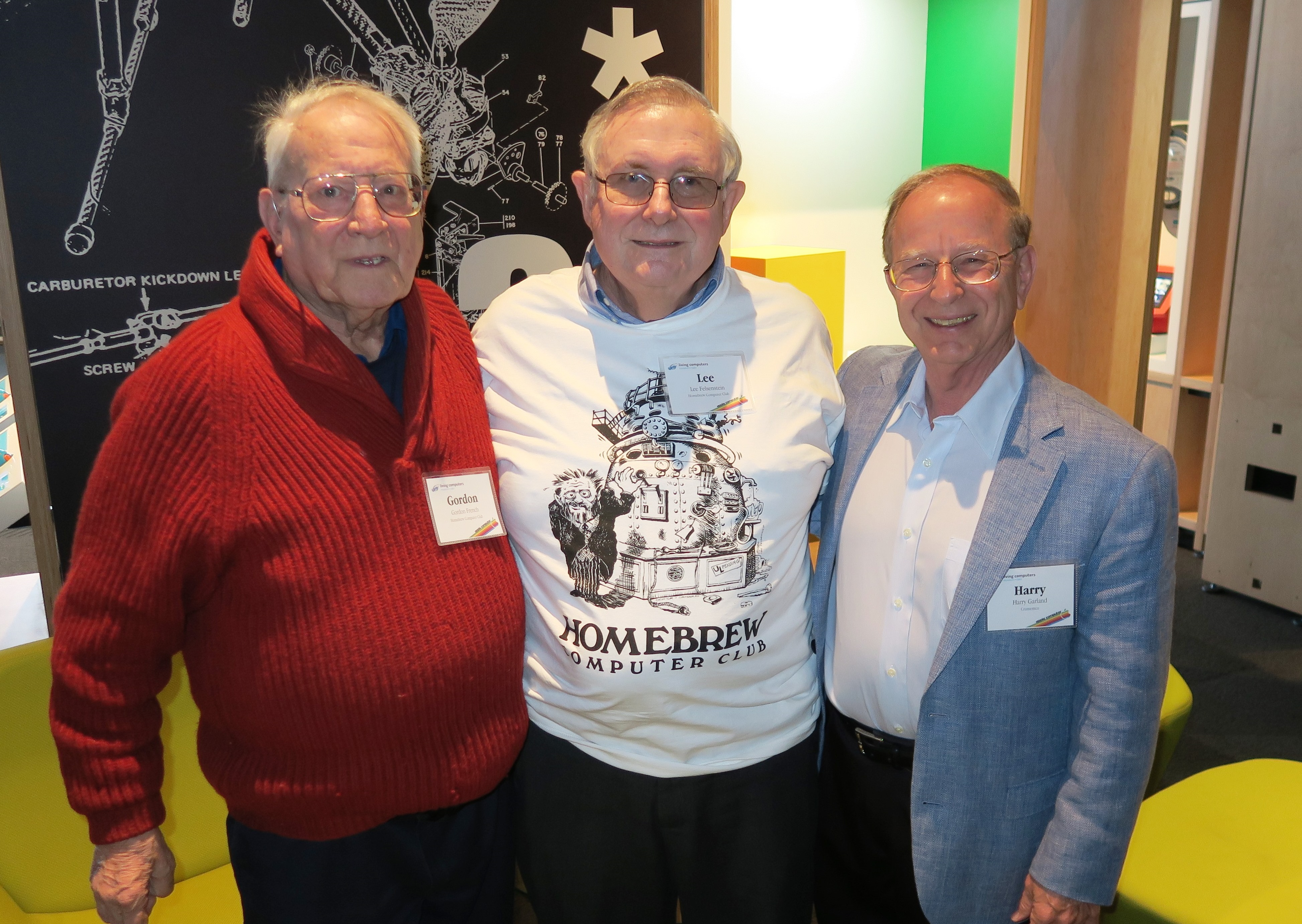
Gordon French, Lee Felsenstein, and Harry Garland would frequent the Oasis following the formal meetings of the club.

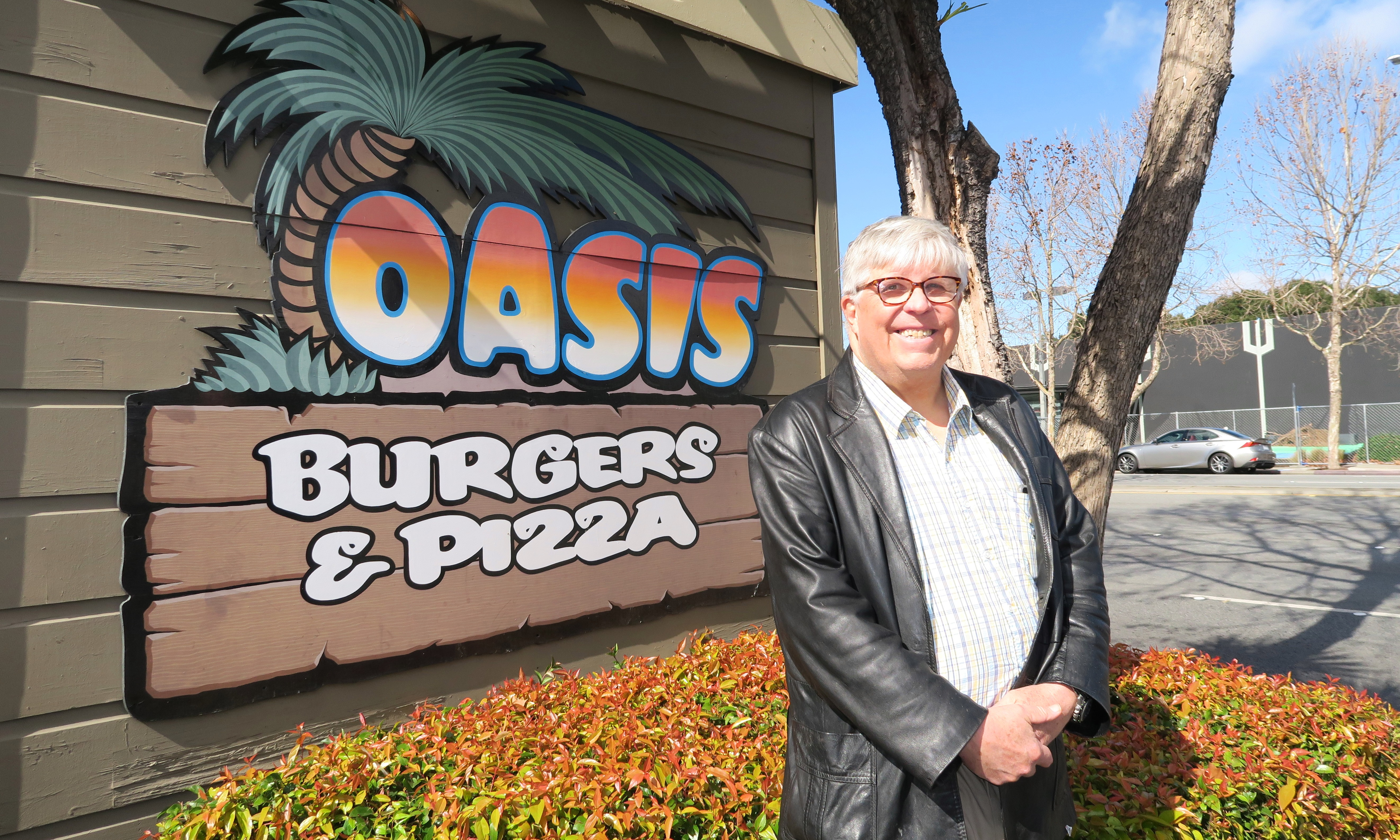
Roger Melen, who suggested meeting here, at the Oasis

The Homebrew Computer Club was an informal group of electronics enthusiasts and technically minded hobbyists who gathered to trade parts, circuits, and information pertaining to DIY construction of personal computing devices. It was started by Gordon French and Fred Moore who met at the Community Computer Center in Menlo Park. They both were interested in maintaining a regular, open forum for people to get together to work on making computers more accessible to everyone.

The first meeting of the club was held on March 5, 1975, in French's garage in Menlo Park, San Mateo County, California, on the occasion of the arrival in the area of the first Micro Instrumentation and Telemetry Systems (MITS) Altair 8800 microcomputer, a unit sent for review by People's Computer Company. Steve Wozniak credits that first meeting as the inspiration to design the Apple I. The second meeting was held at Peninsula School in Menlo Park, California. Subsequent meetings were held at an auditorium at the Stanford Linear Accelerator Center (SLAC), until 1978, when meetings moved to the Stanford Medical School.

An anecdote from member Thomas "Todd" Fischer relates that after the more-or-less "formal" meetings the participants often reconvened for an informal, late night "swap meet" in the parking lot of the Safeway store down the road, as SLAC campus rules prohibited such activity on campus property. Others, at the suggestion of Roger Melen, convened at The Oasis, a bar and grill they considered a pub located on El Camino Real in nearby Menlo Park, recalled years later by a member as "Homebrew's other staging area". As Steven Levy wrote about the Oasis gatherings:

Piling into wooden booths with tables deeply etched with the initials of generations of Stanford students, Garland and Melen and Marsh and Felsenstein and Dompier and French and whoever else felt like showing up would get emboldened by the meeting's energy and pitchers of beer.

The Oasis closed on March 7, 2018, due to unaffordable rent. Its Menlo Park building is a historical landmark; in 2019 the building became home to a venture capital firm, Pear VC.

The 1999 made-for-television movie Pirates of Silicon Valley (and the book on which it is based, Fire in the Valley: The Making of the Personal Computer) describes the role the Homebrew Computer Club played in creating the first personal computers, although the movie took the liberty of placing the meeting in Berkeley and misrepresented the meeting process.

Many of the original members of the Homebrew Computer Club continue to meet (as of 2009), having formed the 6800 Club, named after the Motorola (now Freescale) 6800 microprocessor. Occasionally and variously renamed after the release of the 6800, 6809, and other microprocessors, the group continues to meet monthly in Cupertino, California.

== Members ==
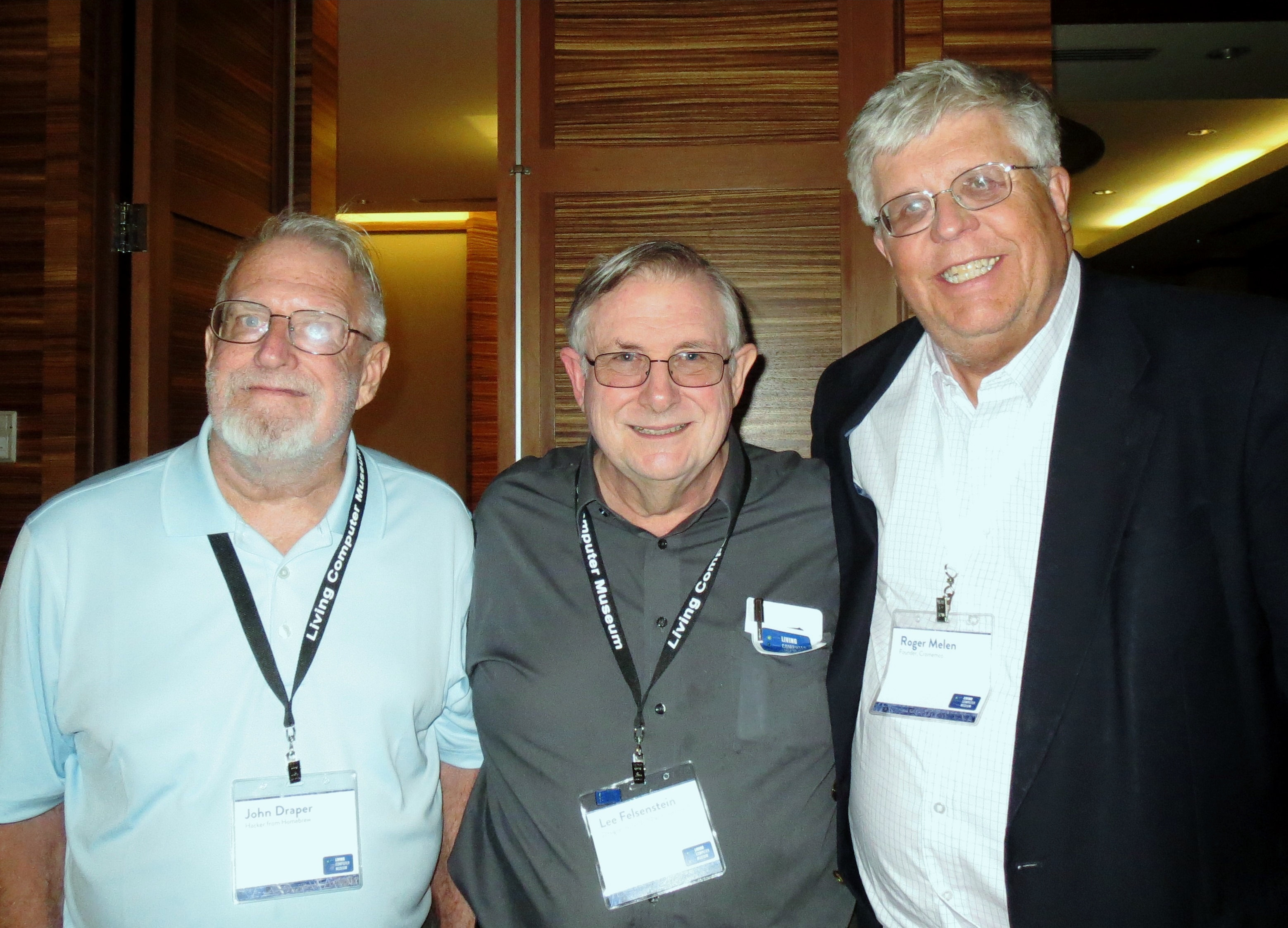
Club members John Draper ("Captain Crunch"), Lee Felsenstein, and Roger Melen

Most of the members were hobbyists but had an electronic engineering or computer programming background. They came to the meetings to talk about the Altair 8800, to review other technical topics, and to exchange schematics and programming tips.

From the ranks of this club came the founders of many microcomputer companies, including Steve Wozniak and Steve Jobs (Apple Computer), Harry Garland and Roger Melen (Cromemco), Thomas "Todd" Fischer (IMSAI Division, Fischer-Freitas Company), George Morrow (Morrow Designs), Paul Terrell (Byte Shop), Adam Osborne (Osborne Computer), and Bob Marsh (Processor Technology). John Draper was a member of the club, as was Jerry Lawson (creator of the first cartridge-based video game system, Fairchild Channel F).

Li-Chen Wang, developer of Palo Alto Tiny Basic and graphics software for the Cromemco Dazzler, was a club member, and Lee Felsenstein was moderator of the club meetings. Steve Inness was a primary designer of one of the early cell phone touch screens as well as a business partner with John Draper. Liza Loop was an early member and the first woman to join.

Others went on to other pursuits, such as Dan Werthimer, who is a researcher in the search for extraterrestrial intelligence.

== Newsletter ==
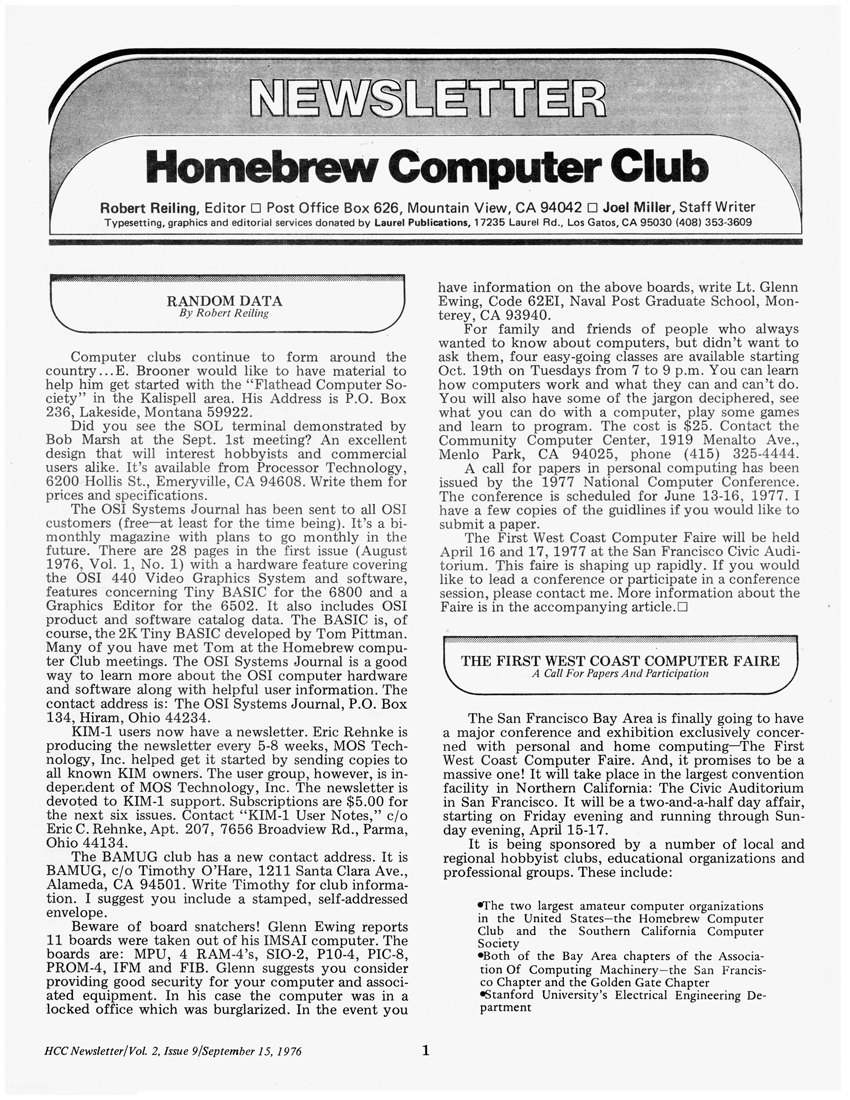
Club newsletter, September 1976

The Homebrew Computer Club's newsletter was one of the most influential forces in the formation of the culture of Silicon Valley. Created and edited by its members, it initiated the idea of the personal computer, and helped its members build the original kit computers, like the Altair. One such influential event was the publication of Bill Gates's "Open Letter to Hobbyists", which lambasted the early hackers of the time for violating the copyrights of commercial software programs.

Paul Terrell, partner in Repco who was the exclusive sales rep company for MITS in Northern California, was a member of the club and would provide information at the meetings about the progress of the Altair 8800 in the factory and provide copies of the MITS Newsletter to members. He later started Byte Shop, an affordable computer store in Mountain View, California, and bought the first 50 Apple I Computers from Steve Jobs and Steve Wozniak after they did a demonstration of the Apple I at a meeting at SLAC.

The first issue of the newsletter was published on March 15, 1975, and continued through several designs, ending after 21 issues in December 1977. The newsletter was published from a variety of addresses in the early days, but later submissions went to a P.O. box address in Mountain View, California.

The second volume began on January 31, 1976, and included sections for A LETTER FROM MITS, CASSETTE UPDATE, TINY BASIC, MEETING FACILITIES, SOFTWARE, PROBLEMS, MEETING-1, and ALTAIR 680.

== Reunions ==
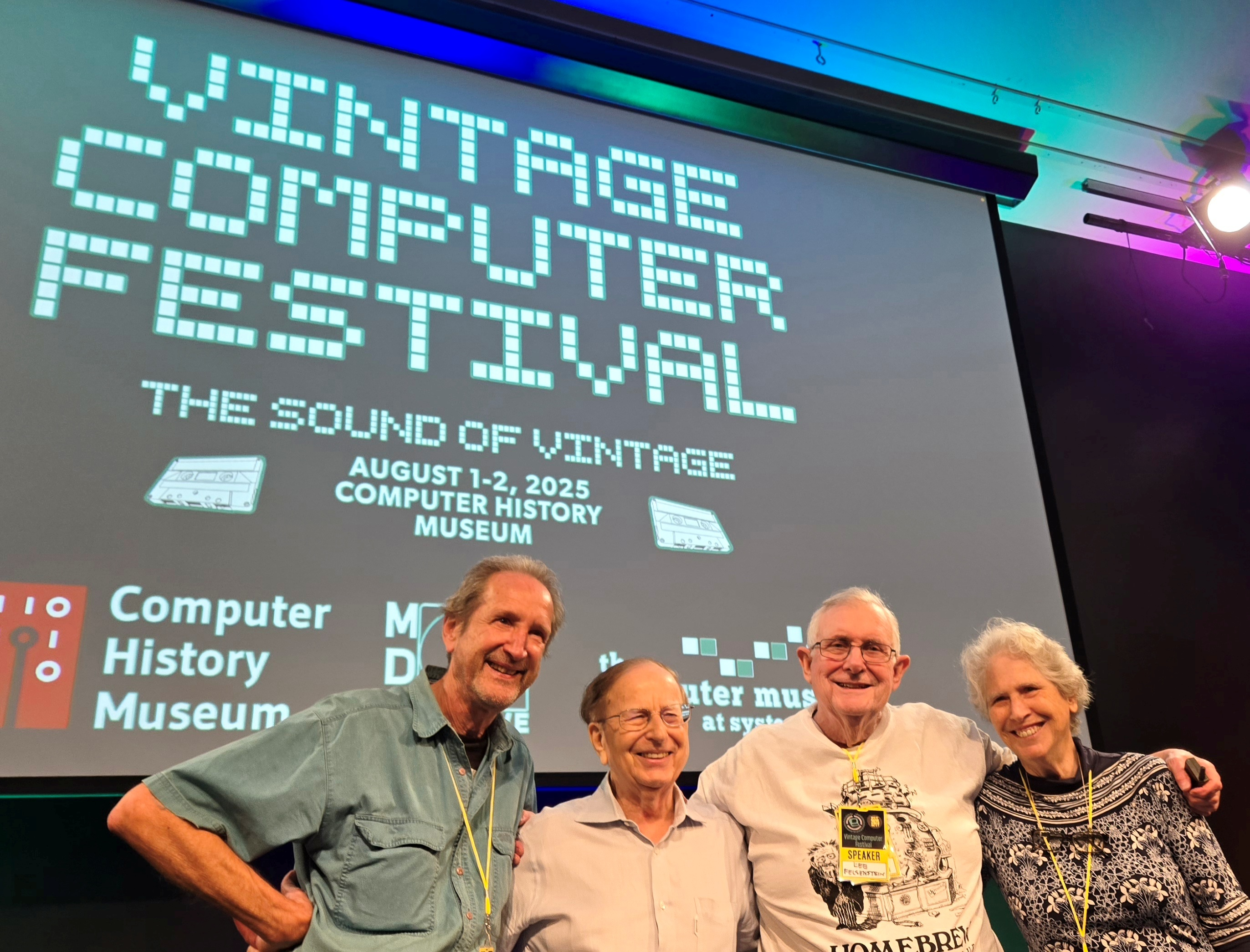
2025 reunion at the Vintage Computer Festival with Daniel Kottke, Harry Garland, Lee Felsenstein, and Liza Loop

There have been several reunions of the Homebrew Computer Club over the years, including a reunion of the original members on March 5, 2001 and a 30-year anniversary celebration on November 5, 2005.

On August 1, 2025 the Computer History Museum hosted an event titled "The Homebrew Computer Club at 50" as part of the Vintage Computer Festival. The speakers included Lee Felsenstein, Liza Loop, Harry Garland, and Daniel Kottke. Participating remotely (via Zoom) were Ted Nelson, Bob Marsh, and Dan Sokol.

== In popular culture ==
The club is depicted in the films Pirates of Silicon Valley (1999) and Jobs (2013), as well as in the PBS documentary series Triumph of the Nerds (1996). However, the depiction of how the club worked was not entirely accurate.

== See also ==
- Adam Osborne
- Berkeley Macintosh User Group
- Boston Computer Society
- Chaos Computer Club, a large and influential German club
- Computer History Museum
- Dr. Dobb's Journal
- Hackers: Heroes of the Computer Revolution
- Hobby Computer Club
- "HAL-PC, Previously Houston Computer Club".
- Kilobaud Microcomputing
- West Coast Computer Faire
