= The Perfect Thing =

2006 nonfiction book by Steven Levy

The Perfect Thing: How the iPod Shuffles Commerce, Culture, and Coolness
- Author: Steven Levy
- Language: English
- Subject: iPod
- Genre: Nonfiction
- Publisher: Simon & Schuster
- Publication date: 24 October 2006
- Publication place: United States
- Media type: Print
- Pages: 284 (hardcover)
- ISBN: 978-0-7432-8522-3

The Perfect Thing: How the iPod Shuffles Commerce, Culture, and Coolness is a book written by Steven Levy, an American journalist. It covers the growth of the idea of Apple's very own iPod, from its origins before its introduction in 2001 to its development to the iPod Nano and the fifth-generation video iPod.

== Synopsis ==
In an author's note, Levy writes,

Early in the process of planning The Perfect Thing, I decided to organize it by aspects of the iPod, instead of in a chronological narrative. One day, while, appropriately, shuffling songs on my iPod, I had an idea that could spiritually link my book to its subject: I would shuffle the chapters. Each one would be written to stand on its own and not require others as antecedents... By shuffling my chapters, I hope to spotlight these issues--and to have some fun, another thing that squares with the spirit of the iPod.

=== Contents ===
- Perfect
- Identity
- Origin
- Cool
- Personal
- Download
- Shuffle
- Apple
- Podcast
- Coda

Levy starts the book with a timeline of the iPod, running from October 2001 to October 2005. He then writes in a shuffled set of chapters, focusing on the "perfect" aspects of the iPod—the origins and the idea of the iPod, its ability to create an identity and a familiar community, its coolness factor, how it made music personal for individuals, and how it changed the music industry with Apple's iTunes Store.

The book includes quotes, interviews, and anecdotes with such individuals as Apple's co-founder and CEO, Steve Jobs; Microsoft chairman, Bill Gates; cultural anthropologist at the University of Utrecht and noted "Professor of Cool," Dr. Carl Rohde; founder of MP3.com, Michael Robertson; and many others.

== Reception ==
Publishers Weekly wrote: "Combining upbeat reportage about the device's origins and development with higher-minded ruminations about its place at 'the center of just about every controversy in the digital age,' he explores how the iPod 'set the technology world, the business world, and especially the music industry on its head.'"

Cory Doctorow of Boing Boing wrote: "The impact of "shuffling," of carrying your collection in your pocket, of putting digital music in the hands of info-civilians who never would have put up with the crummy design and arcane interfaces of the early competitors—these are big stories that will play out for decades yet, and Levy's book does the best job I've yet seen of categorizing and taking the measure of these great shifts."
