= The Hacker Ethic and the Spirit of the Information Age =

2001 book by Pekka Himanen

- Author: Pekka Himanen
- Publication date: 2001
- ISBN: 978-0-375-50566-9

The Hacker Ethic and the Spirit of the Information Age is a book released in 2001, and written by Pekka Himanen, with prologue written by Linus Torvalds and the epilogue written by Manuel Castells.

Pekka Himanen is a philosopher. Manuel Castells is an internationally well-known sociologist. Linus Torvalds is the creator of the Linux kernel. The book has the ISBN 978-0-375-50566-9.

== See also ==
- Hacker ethic
- Linus's law
- The Art of Unix Programming
