= Project One (San Francisco) =

Intentional community in San Francisco, California

Coordinates: 37.7743°N 122.4144°W

A part of the counterculture of the 1970s, Project One, sometimes described as a technological commune, was an intentional community and community of place in San Francisco, California, United States, that operated from 1970 to 1980. Housed in an 84,000 square foot warehouse at 1380 Howard Street, a former abandoned candy factory, it was the city's first "warehouse community". Its members, a shifting mix of students, craftspeople, artisans, sculptors, filmmakers, and technologists, were anchored by a number of resident organisations. The community had no formal structure; decisions were made by consensus at voluntary weekly meetings.

Project One was initiated by architect Ralph Scott, a former student of Buckminster Fuller, who also founded Symbas Alternative High School on the building's first floor. Many resident organisations and small businesses served as resources for Symbas students, who found mentors within the community and opportunities to practise new skills.

== Construction ==
The warehouse was leased in 1970 with all internal walls and structures already stripped from the basement, four floors, and penthouse, leaving only the steel reinforced concrete structural columns. Residents designed and built the walls, hallways, living and working spaces, and the electrical and plumbing systems themselves, largely through on-the-job training, reflecting the do-it-yourself ethic of the counterculture. The range of skills within the community meant outside contractors were rarely needed.

== History ==
Project One traces its origin to the spring of 1970, when architect Ralph Scott, a former student of Buckminster Fuller, began discussing the idea of a communal live-work warehouse with friends after a period of personal crisis. Around 100 people eventually signed a five year lease on the empty 84,000 square foot former candy factory at 1380 Howard Street, at a reported rent of 4,200 dollars a month plus roughly 1,000 dollars in utilities. Prospective residents were screened by the existing community for the practical skills and commitment they could offer, a policy credited with shaping the technically capable, do-it-yourself character for which Project One became known. Population estimates vary across sources: a 1976 account put the number of residents at over 80, with a further 200 people using the building for work but living elsewhere, while a former resident later recalled around 78 to 79 people living there at one point, with rent working out, in inflation adjusted terms, to roughly 400 dollars a person a month. Governance was informal: decisions were made by consensus at weekly meetings held in the fifth floor penthouse, and residents shared a rotating building maintenance schedule.

Computing became central to the community from 1971, when Pam Hardt and a group of former Berkeley computer science students, several of whom had left the university amid protests against the Cambodian campaign, founded Resource One with the aim of applying computing skills to community organising. Funding included a grant from the Stern Fund and money left over from the Whole Earth Catalog's Demise Party. In 1972, the Transamerica Corporation donated a surplus XDS-940 mainframe computer, worth around 150,000 dollars, in exchange for a tax write-off; the machine was installed within days of its arrival and became a free access community computing resource, used for bookkeeping, typesetting, and mailing by groups including Amnesty International and the Tenants' Action League. Resource One's projects included the Social Services Referral Directory, a listing of San Francisco social service agencies for caseworkers, later administered by the United Way from 1975 and by the San Francisco Public Library from 1994 until its discontinuation around 2009. In January 1971, Resource One joined the Ecology Center Press, the Haight-Ashbury Switchboard, and Symbas Alternative High School in coordinating volunteers after two Standard Oil tankers collided in San Francisco Bay, causing the 1971 San Francisco Bay oil spill; a Symbas student, Ray Baltar Jr., later recalled staffing the Switchboard's phones as calls poured in from would-be volunteers, an effort that contributed to the founding of International Bird Rescue.

In 1973, Lee Felsenstein, Efrem Lipkin, Ken Colstad, Jude Milhon, and Mark Szpakowski, working out of Resource One, created Community Memory, installing its first public terminal at Leopold's Records in Berkeley; it is regarded as the first public computerised bulletin board system. Felsenstein went on to play a central role in the development of the personal computer. The building's basement also housed Optic Nerve, a photography collective founded in 1970 that moved into video production in 1972, beginning with a documentary about Project One itself. Journalist Stewart Brand, profiling the community for Rolling Stone in December 1972, described unrealised plans for video artist Steve Beck to relocate his newly built real time video synthesiser into the basement alongside Resource One's computer. Brand's article, along with later scholarship such as historian Fred Turner's 2006 study of the Whole Earth network, framed Resource One as part of a countercultural hacker ethos that linked Bay Area computing to the emerging personal computer industry, including contemporaneous work at Xerox PARC. A 2017 book accompanying the London Design Museum's "California: Designing Freedom" exhibition similarly described Project One, in the words of historian Simon Sadler, as "the Catalog's vision of community become real", referring to Brand's Whole Earth Catalog.

Dozens of other groups operated out of the building over the decade, among them a radio production outfit (Airwaves), San Francisco's first Methadone clinic (Fort Help), a chapter of Vietnam Veterans Against the War, a preschool run by Rashid "Ray" Patch, a recording studio built by the Blossom family (former members of Fifty Foot Hose), custom electronics and lighting design by db Associates, whose credits included an amplified 40 piece "Electric Symphony Orchestra", electrical research by engineer Eric P. Dollard, and a school of holography whose techniques were, according to one account, later used by artists including Salvador Dalí. In 1972, according to the same account, the building was placed under surveillance by operatives connected to Watergate figure James W. McCord Jr., who later testified to the US Senate that his team had covertly funded a media project at Project One while monitoring conversations there.

By the mid-1970s, many of Project One's founding members had left, and the community gradually shifted from collective self-sufficiency toward a more conventional tenancy, with paid outside labour increasingly replacing volunteer work. The community was evicted around 1980, a fate shared by most of San Francisco's early industrial art spaces; a nearby contemporary, Project Artaud, survived because its members bought their building outright in 1971. The 1380 Howard Street building later housed the San Francisco Department of Parking and Traffic's citation bureau. Project One's model inspired similar warehouse communities in San Francisco and beyond, and its computing projects have continued to draw scholarly attention, including a 2024 to 2025 feature in Pratt Institute's Multiplicity magazine examining Resource One and Community Memory as early experiments in community oriented technology.

== Media ==
- An hour long documentary on Project One by Optic Nerve
