= Backchannel (blog) =

- Website type: Blog
- Dissolved: 2018
- Owner: Condé Nast
- Editor: Steven Levy
- Website: medium.com/backchannel
- Launched: 2014

Backchannel was an online magazine that published in-depth stories on technology-related news on Medium.

== History ==
In early 2014, Ev Williams, founder of Medium, invited Stephen from Wired to start a tech column on Medium, Backchannel.

Backchannel has interviewed many notable figures, such as Demis Hassabis of Google DeepMind and Orrin Hatch of the Republican Party. The journalists who wrote for the site included Steven Levy, Andrew Leonard, Susan P. Crawford, Virginia Heffernan, Doug Menuez, Peter Diamandis, and Jessi Hempel.

In 2016, it was announced that Condé Nast had purchased Backchannel, though no terms of the deal were communicated, and only a transfer of the editorial team was planned. In September 2017, it was officially announced that Backchannel would become a weekly magazine on Wired.com. It was also explained that Backchannel had migrated away from Medium because of the platform's shifting business model. In January 2018, publications definitely stopped on Medium. Backchannel.com now redirects to Wired's section The Big story.

Backchannel was the last "major sponsored publications built on top of Medium’s publishing platform".

== See also ==
- Geekadelphia
