= Gordon French =

American computer engineer and programmer (1935–2019)

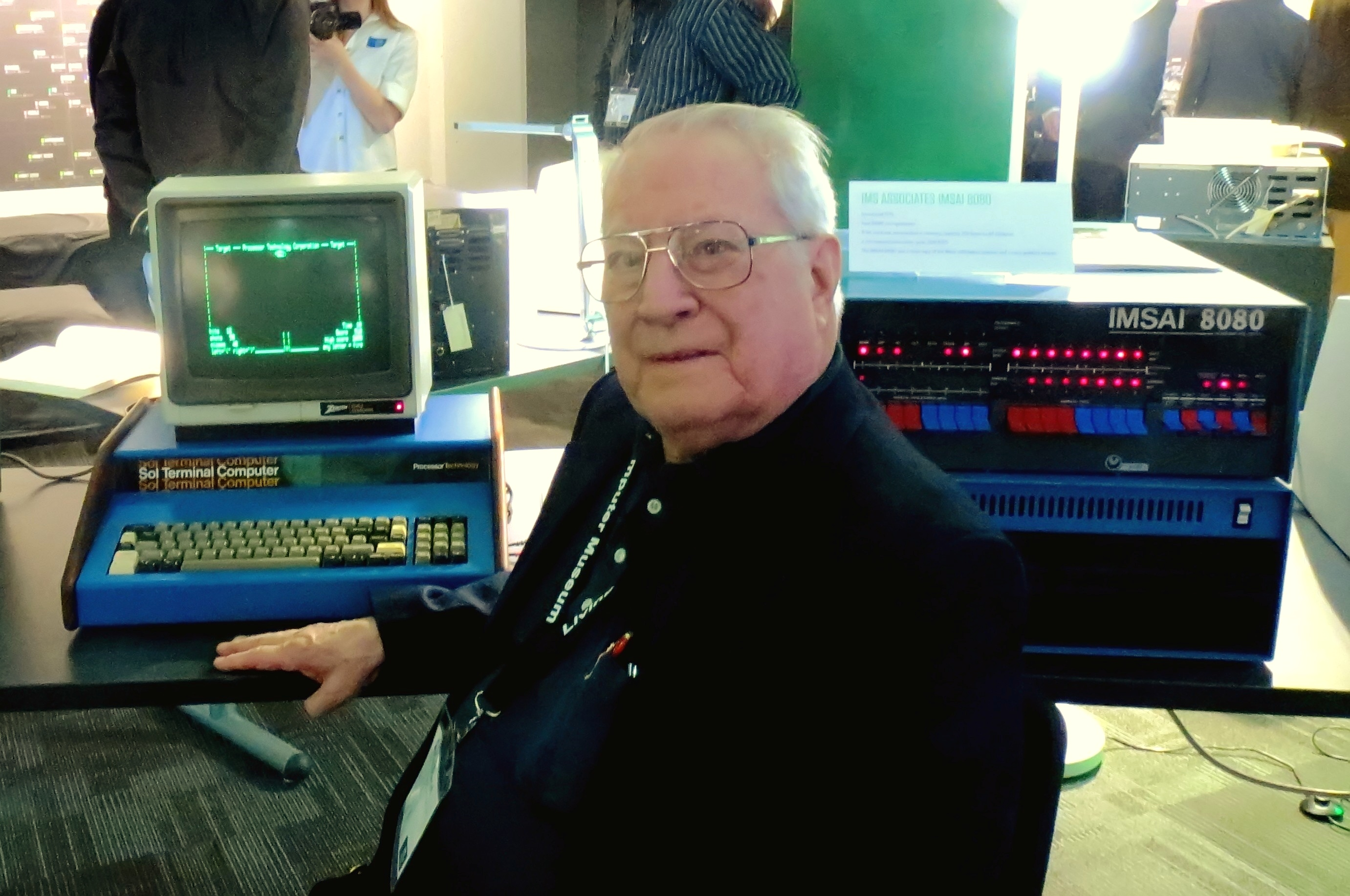
- French at the Living Computer Museum in 2013
- Born: March 7, 1935
- Died: October 26, 2019 (aged 84); Roseburg, Oregon
- Education: Portland State University
- Known for: Homebrew Computer Club

Gordon French (March 7, 1935 – October 26, 2019) was an American computer engineer and programmer who played a key role in the Homebrew Computer Club. He died on October 26, 2019, in Roseburg, Oregon.

On March 5, 1975, Gordon French hosted the first meeting of the Homebrew Computer Club in his garage, in Menlo Park, San Mateo County, California. He attended the first three sessions, but when he was offered a post at the Social Security Administration, he moved to Baltimore.
