= Steven Levy =

American journalist (born 1951)

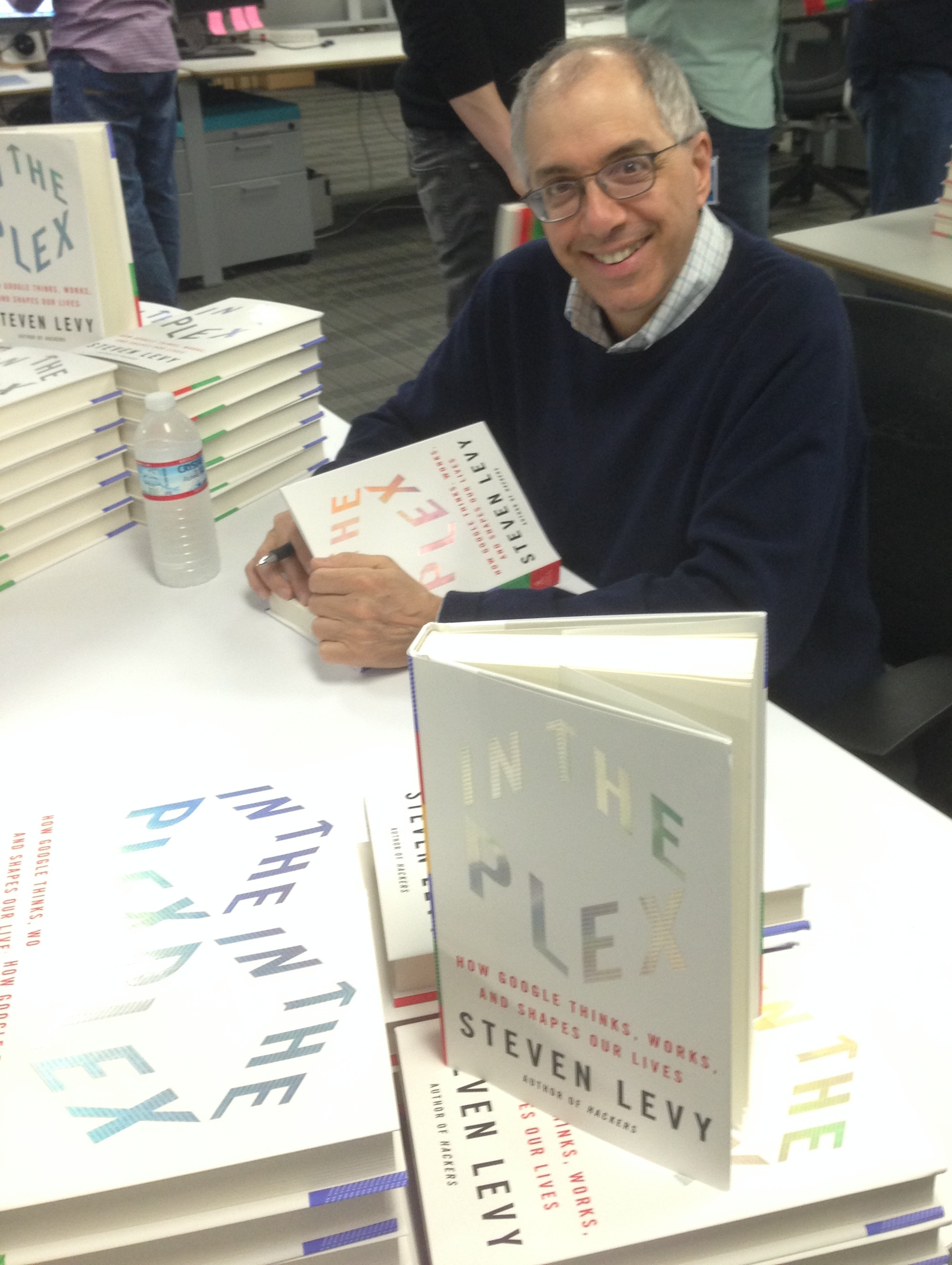
- Author Steven Levy at a book signing at Nest Labs in Palo Alto, February 2014
- Born: 1951 (age 74–75); Philadelphia, Pennsylvania, United States
- Education: Temple University (BA); Pennsylvania State University (MA)
- Occupations: Author, columnist
- Spouse: Teresa Carpenter
- Children: 1 son
- Writing career
- Genres: non-fiction (science-technology, business)
- Notable works: Hackers; Crypto; The Perfect Thing; In the Plex
- Website: stevenlevy.com

Steven Levy (born 1951) is an American journalist and editor at large for Wired who has written extensively for publications on computers, technology, cryptography, the internet, cybersecurity, and privacy. He is the author of the 1984 book Hackers: Heroes of the Computer Revolution, which chronicles the early days of the computer underground. Levy has published eight books covering computer hacker culture, artificial intelligence, cryptography, and multi-year exposés of Apple, Google, and Facebook. His most recent book, Facebook: The Inside Story, recounts the history and rise of Facebook from three years of interviews with employees, including Chamath Palihapitiya, Sheryl Sandberg, and Mark Zuckerberg.

== Early life and education ==
Levy was born in Philadelphia in 1951. He graduated from Central High School and received a bachelor's degree in English from Temple University. He earned a master's degree in literature from Pennsylvania State University.

== Career ==
In the mid-1970s, Levy worked as a freelance journalist and frequently contributed to The Philadelphia Inquirer's Today magazine. In 1976, he was a founding co-editor of the Free Times, a weekly guide to happenings in Philadelphia. He became as senior editor of New Jersey Monthly, and rediscovered Albert Einstein's brain floating in a mason jar in the Wichita office of pathologist Thomas Stoltz Harvey while reporting a story in 1978.

In the 1980s, Levy's work became more focused on technology. In 1981, Rolling Stone assigned him an article on computer hackers, which he expanded into a book Hackers: Heroes of the Computer Revolution, published in 1984. He described the "hacker ethic", the belief that all information should be free and that it ought to change life for the better. Levy was a contributor to Stewart Brand's Whole Earth Software Catalog, first published in 1984. He was a contributing editor to Popular Computing and wrote a monthly column in the magazine, initially called "Telecomputing" and later named "Micro Journal" and "Computer Journal", from April 1983 to the magazine's closure in December 1985. In December 1986, Levy founded the Macworld Game Hall of Fame, which Macworld published annually until 2009. Levy stepped away from the technology beat in his second book, on the murderous past of hippie and Earth Day co-founder Ira Einhorn, published in 1988 and adapted into an NBC TV miniseries with Naomi Watts in 1999. Levy's 1992 book about AI called Artificial Life was a finalist for the Los Angeles Times Book Prize for Science and Technology. In 1994, he published the book Insanely Great about the Mac computer.

Levy joined Newsweek in 1995 as a technology writer and senior editor. In July 2004, Levy published a cover story for Newsweek (which also featured an interview with Apple CEO Steve Jobs) which unveiled the 4th generation of the iPod to the world before Apple had officially done so. He continued his coverage of the iPod into a book called The Perfect Thing published in 2006. In 2007, Levy was one of only four journalists (alongside Ed Baig, Walt Mossberg, and David Pogue) provided with advance access to the first iPhone in order to review it.

In 2014, he co-created the tech blog Backchannel, which was integrated into Wired in 2017. Since 2008, Levy has worked as a writer and editor at large for Wired. At various points throughout his career, Levy has written freelance pieces for publications including Harper's, The New York Times Magazine, The New Yorker, and Premiere.

== Personal life ==
He lives in New York City with his wife Teresa Carpenter, a Pulitzer Prize-winning true crime and history writer. They have a son.

== Bibliography ==
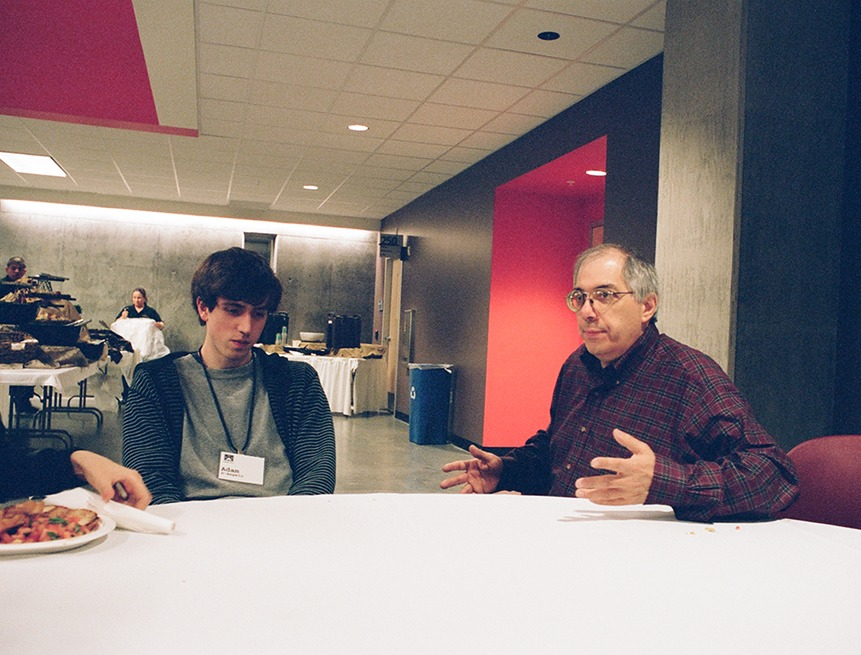
Steven Levy and Adam D'Angelo (left)

=== Books ===
- Hackers: Heroes of the Computer Revolution (1984)
- The Unicorn's Secret: Murder in the Age of Aquarius (1988)
- Artificial Life: The Quest for a New Creation (1992)
- Insanely Great: The Life and Times of Macintosh, the Computer That Changed Everything (1994)
- Crypto: How the Code Rebels Beat the Government Saving Privacy in the Digital Age (2001)
- The Perfect Thing: How the iPod Shuffles Commerce, Culture, and Coolness (2006)
- In The Plex: How Google Thinks, Works, and Shapes Our Lives (2011)
- Facebook: The Inside Story (2020)

=== Essays and reporting ===
- Levy, Steven (November 1982) [Fall/Winter 1982]. "Me and My Computer". Playboy Guide: Electronic Entertainment. Vol. 2, no. 2. pp. 38–41, 84.
- Levy, Steven (December 2013). "Like minds (Bill Gates and President Bill Clinton on the NSA, Safe Sex, and American Exceptionalism)". Wired. Vol. 21, no. 12. pp. 234–244.
