= Paul Terrell =

American businessman

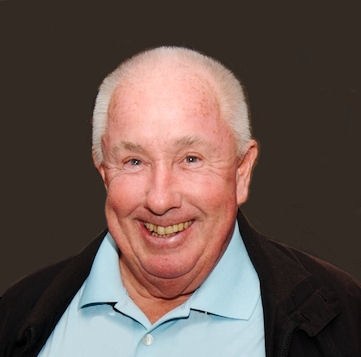
Terrell

Paul Terrell is an American businessman. In December 1975, he founded Byte Shop, the first personal computer retailer shop. He helped popularize personal computing to the hobbyist and home computing markets, and was the first retailer to sell an Apple Computer, the Apple I.

== The Byte Shop ==
Paul Terrell started the Byte Shop in Mountain View, California in December 1975. By January, he was approached by individuals who wanted to open their own stores. He signed dealership agreements with them, whereby he would take a percentage of their profits, and soon there were Byte Shops in Hayward, Santa Clara, San Jose, Palo Alto, Fresno, and Portland, Oregon.

In March 1976, Terrell incorporated as Byte, Inc. and was one of the four big computer retailers, along with Dick Heisers, ("The Computer Store"), Peachtree in Atlanta, and Dick Brown.

=== Apple I ===
The Byte Shop was the first retailer of the original Apple I computer. At the time Steve Jobs was planning to sell bare circuit boards for $40, but Terrell told him that he would be interested in the machine only if it came fully assembled, and promised to order 50 of the machines and pay $500 each on delivery.

Jobs contacted Cramer Electronics to order the components he needed to assemble the Apple I Computer. When asked how he was going to pay for the parts, he replied, "I have this purchase order from the Byte Shop chain of computer stores for 50 of my computers and the payment terms are COD. If you give me the parts on a net 30 day terms I can build and deliver the computers in that time frame, collect my money from Terrell at the Byte Shop and pay you." The credit manager called Paul Terrell and verified the validity of the purchase order.

Steve Jobs and Steve Wozniak and their small team spent day and night building and testing the computers and delivered to Terrell on time to pay his suppliers and have a profit left over for their celebration and next order.

=== Expansion ===
Terrell grew the enterprise from the first company-owned store in Mountain View, California into a chain of dealerships initially, and eventually into a franchise operation that reached from the United States to Japan.

Byte, Inc. was not only involved in the expansion of its retail chain of stores but began a manufacturing operation to build its own proprietary BYT-8 Computer which was provided only to the Byte Shop stores. This gave both Byte Inc. and its Byte Shops a better profit margin than could be achieved by just distributing the computers of the other computer manufacturers at the time.

=== Legacy ===
In 1977, Terrell sold his chain of 58 Byte Shops to John Peers of Logical Machine Corporation.

Many of the original Byte Shop dealers eventually became independent as the personal computer marketplace grew and became segmented by the various uses and applications the PC was developing. Hobby computer stores were becoming business centers and IBM was entering the market with a computer of its own which over time would become the standard in the industry. Byte Shops of Arizona became MicroAge Computers and developed into a major national distributor as well as having its own chain of stores. Byte Shop Northwest dominated its geographical area and was acquired by Pacific Bell in 1985 when they elected to get into computer stores.

He was portrayed by Brad William Henke in the biopic Jobs.

== Exidy Sorcerer Computer ==
After selling the Byte Store chain, Terrell convinced his friends Ivy and Kauffman of coin-operated video game company Exidy, Inc to design and build the Exidy Sorcerer to compete with the Apple II, Commodore PET and Tandy TRS-80 computers already in the marketplace.

The Sorcerer was a modified S-100 bus based machine, but lacked the internal expansion system common to other S-100 systems. It made do with an S-100 expansion card-edge that could connect to an external S-100 expansion cage. The Sorcerer also featured an advanced (for the era) text display that was capable of 64 characters per line, when most systems supported only 40 characters. The Sorcerer did not support sound, color, or in some respects, graphics, which seems at odds with the company's video game background; however, the characters it displayed were programmable by the user.

The Sorcerer made its debut at the Long Beach Computer Show in April 1978 at $895 and generated a 4,000 unit back-log on introduction. The system was never very popular in North America, but found a following in Australia and Europe, notably the Netherlands where the Teleac (broadcaster) used the Exidy Sorcerer for the course Microprocessors. The main importer, Compudata later Tulip Computers, licensed the computer and sold it under their own name until 1983.

Exidy licensed the Sorcerer computer and its software to a Texas-based startup called Dynasty Computer Corporation in 1979. It was relabeled and sold by Dynasty as the Dynasty Smart-Alec.

== Romox ==
Romox, Inc. was an early American technology company specializing in the electronic software distribution (ESD) of home computer games and video games. Co-Founded in 1982 by "Dan" Izumi, who held the patents, and Paul Terrell. The company was headquartered in Campbell, California. Romox is widely recognized as an early pioneer in retail, on-demand digital delivery.

Operating at the height of the early home computer boom and the video game crash of 1983–1984, the company attempted to eliminate the overhead costs and inventory risks of physical retail software by deploying interactive, in-store kiosks that programmed reusable Erasable Programmable Read-Only Memory (EPROM) cartridges on demand.

== ComputerMania ==
Paul Terrell started ComputerMania Inc. which was a chain of computer stores created with the purpose of renting computers and software. Computer Retailer Magazine did a feature article on the viability of renting computers and software to the public prior to the passing of legislation in Congress which outlawed the rental of software because of software piracy issues. Hardware rental, however, was unaffected by this decision and continued to flourish into a multibillion-dollar industry.
