= Net 10 =

Net 10 can mean:

- .NET 10, the 10 version of .NET from Microsoft.
- NET10 Wireless, a prepaid mobile phone brand of TracFone Wireless, the U.S. MVNO subsidiary of Verizon
- A trade credit notation (in Net D form) on an invoice stating full payment is due in 10 days
- NET 10, an Indonesian news program broadcast on NET
