= Romox =

American technology company

- Industry: Video games, software
- Founded: 1982
- Founders: "Dan" Izumi and Paul Terrell
- Defunct: 1984
- Headquarters: Campbell, California, United States

Romox Inc. was an early American technology company specializing in the electronic software distribution (ESD) of home computer games and video games. Co-Founded in 1982 by "Dan" Izumi, who held the patents, and Paul Terrell, who is best known for founding the Byte Shop, the retail chain that bought the first 50 Apple I computers. The company was headquartered in Campbell, California. Romox is widely recognized as an early pioneer in retail, on-demand digital delivery.

Operating at the height of the early home computer boom and the video game crash of 1983–1984, the company attempted to eliminate the overhead costs and inventory risks of physical retail software by deploying interactive, in-store kiosks that programmed reusable erasable programmable read-only memory (EPROM) cartridges on demand. Despite striking licensing deals with major software publishers, macroeconomic pressures and high manufacturing costs forced the company to cease operations in late 1984.

== History ==
Romox Inc. was established in late 1982 by Paul Terrell, who envisioned a system that would solve the primary bottleneck of early 1980s software retail: inventory risk. At the time, retailers were forced to buy physical cartridges and cassette tapes months in advance, frequently getting stuck with unsold stock if a game failed commercially, or facing severe shortages if a title became an unexpected hit. The cartridges were also a big problem for the video game publishers due to the high manufacturing cost.

At the time, video games were sold to major chain retailers through "rack jobbers", who were the distribution channel for record companies. Jon Monday was hired in Los Angeles, who had 12 years experience in the record business dealing with the same major distributors. After a few months, he relocated to Northern California to work out of the main office and became the company's Vice President of Product Marketing and was interfacing with retailers and reaching out to major game publishers to license their titles for distribution in the Romox system.

Romox debuted its proprietary Romox Programming Terminal at trade shows in mid-1983, targeting widespread commercial rollouts by early 1984. The company pitched the unit to non-traditional software vendors, such as pharmacies, grocery stores, and department stores, arguing that the kiosk required minimal floor space while offering a massive, dynamically updated library of software.

By early 1984, Romox had successfully placed terminals in several major West Coast retail environments, including regional drug store chains and select Kmart locations. However, the company's aggressive expansion directly coincided with the historic video game crash of 1983–1984. As retail chains panicked and systematically removed video game aisles to mitigate losses, the market for new hardware installations rapidly evaporated. Lacking the capital to maintain expensive kiosk hardware infrastructure without massive consumer transaction volume, Romox quietly shuttered its retail operations by the end of 1984.

== Technology and business model ==
The core of Romox's business model was its proprietary in-store electronic software distribution network. The system relied on three distinct technological components:

=== The retail terminal ===
The Romox terminal was a standalone, arcade-style kiosk featuring a color CRT monitor, a navigation joystick, a numeric keypad, and a specialized edge-connector programming slot. The unit stored a catalog of video games and utility software on internal storage media which could be dynamically updated.

=== Reusable EPROM cartridges ===
Customers purchased a proprietary, blank Romox cartridge for a one-time fee of approximately $20 to $25. The cartridge contained an exposed windowed EPROM chip inside a plastic housing designed to handle repeated read/write cycles. The cartridge was compatible with major contemporary systems, with models manufactured for the Atari 2600, Atari 5200, Commodore 64, VIC-20, and TI-99/4A.

=== The "Swapper" software model ===
To buy a game, the customer inserted their blank cartridge into the terminal, selected a title using the touchscreen menu, and initiated the download. The terminal flashed the game data onto the EPROM chip in roughly 30 seconds.

Crucially, Romox pioneered a "software-swapping" economic model: if a player grew tired of a game, they could return to the kiosk, insert the cartridge, and overwrite it with a different title for a heavily discounted fee of $5 to $10. The terminal would erase the existing data and burn the new game onto the same chip.

== Software library and partnerships ==
To attract consumers, Romox secured third-party licensing agreements with several prominent software publishers of the era who wanted to expand their reach without manufacturing physical cartridges. The Romox library grew to feature dozens of titles, balancing action games with educational software. Publishing partners included Epyx, Sierra On-Line, Sirius Software, Coleco.

== Legacy ==
While Romox was a commercial failure, the company is cited by video game historians as an important intellectual precursor to modern digital distribution frameworks. The "PlayMenu" kiosk anticipated concepts later popularized by modern flash cartridges, the Nintendo Power kiosk system in 1990s Japan, the Sega Channel, and ultimately, modern digital storefronts like Steam, Xbox Live, and the PlayStation Network.

== See also ==
- GameLine
