= Leading Technology =

Tech company

Leading Technology, Inc.
- Company type: Private
- Founded: 1985 in Beaverton, Oregon
- Founders: Pat Terrell; Rick Terrell
- Defunct: 1992
- Fate: Acquired by VTech
- Products: Computer systems; Computer peripherals; Monitors
- Number of employees: 350 (1992, peak)

Leading Technology, Inc., was an American computer company based in Beaverton, Oregon, and active from 1985 to 1992. It sold IBM PC–compatible computer systems, monitors, and other peripherals supplied by original equipment manufacturers (OEMs) in Hong Kong, Korea, Taiwan. In 1992, the company was purchased by VTech of Hong Kong.

== History ==
Leading Technology, Inc., was founded by Pat Terrell and Rick Terrell. Pat had previously founded and ran Byte Shop Northwest—the Pacific Northwest operations of the Byte Shop computer retailer licensed from Paul Terrell—from 1976 until 1985, when it was acquired by PacTel Systems, a subsidiary of Pacific Telesis based in San Francisco, California. After being let go from Byte Shop Northwest in June 1986, Pat Terrell discussed founding Leading Technology upon learning that a former employee of his had founded a consumer electronics exporting company in Hong Kong, in which he promptly purchased a significant stake. His numerous business contacts earned while running Byte Shop Northwest combined with his newfound contacts in Hong Kong gave Terrell the idea to found an importer of computer products. In late 1985, he co-founded Leading Technology with his brother Rick, who had previously founded Microware Distributors, a fast-growing company distributor based in Beaverton, Oregon (not to be confused with the software company Microware).

Leading Technology's first attempts at selling desktop computers in 1985 proved unsuccessful due to the volatile pricing inherent to the IBM PC–compatible desktop market in the mid-1980s, so the company ditched these in favor of high-volume importing and selling of computer peripherals—mostly monitors—manufactured by companies in Korea such as Samsung, Hyundai, and GoldStar. By April 1987, the company offered twenty distinct products and was soon to offer keyboards and modems as well. By September 1987, the company generated $1 million in sales per month. Leading Technology moved from an "unimposing" office in a Beaverton business park to cohabit a 77,000-square-foot building downtown with Rick Terrell's erstwhile active Microware in late September 1987. About 15,000 square feet of the new building was dedicated to office space for Leading Technology, while another 35,000 was dedicated to warehousing and assembly of the company's products.

By mid-1990, the company, which now employed 85 people from Beaverton, began selling PC-compatible computer systems again, albeit monitors remained their top-selling product—the company moving roughly 40,000 monitor units a month that year, compared to between 10,000 and 15,000 computer systems over the same duration. Revenues grew from $60 million in revenue in 1989 to $200 million in 1990. After receiving a capital infusion worth between $9.5 million to $12.5 million in fall 1990, the company sold a 50-percent equity interest in the company to the Hong Kong–based VTech, who had manufactured some of the company's products.

In November 1990, the company released HyperDOS, a graphical user interface and file manager for DOS that was aimed at first-time users of personal computers. HyperDOS was mouse and keyboard driven and presented the user a number of index card-shaped buttons through which to perform various commands and view help files that taught the user aspects of personal computing, such as methods of installing software and maintenance the contents of their disks. HyperDOS was included with all of Leading Technology's computer systems but was also released as a standalone retail package that year. Version 2.0 of HyperDOS, released in April 1991, added sound playback, with prerecorded narration supplementing the on-screen text.

Leading Edge subsequently re-launched their computer systems in earnest by establishing the PC Partner brand of low-cost desktops and laptops in 1991, their push into the consumer retail space. In designing the flagship PC Partner, the company stressed aesthetics, coloring the computers in cool gray with purple and teal accents. William O'Neill, Leading Technology's vice president of sales, perceived the traditional beige box appearance of PCs as increasingly antiquated when compared to consumer appliances of the late 1980s and early 1990s. Said O'Neil: "We saw that we were competing with appliances that had a higher-tech look than most PCs! We figured we weren't just up against other PCs, then, but also stereo equipment, TVs and microwave ovens". As well as the paint job, the main case features rounded off edges with matching feet, emulating the look of contemporary home audio gear. The PC Partners received decent reviews in the computer press and allowed the company to grow to a peak employment of 350 people in 1992. PC Partners were primarily sold at warehouse club chains like Costco, Best Products, and Price Club, as well as electronics superstores.

In 1992, the company was acquired in full by VTech, who laid off 50 workers at Leading Technology and rebranded the company's offerings under VTech's own Laser brand. Remaining employees of Leading Technology were shortly after absorbed into VTech Computers International Limited, the subsidiary in charge of production of VTech's personal computers active from 1988 to 1997. The PC Partner brand name meanwhile appeared on some models of VTech's PC offerings in the mid-1990s. In 1997, VTech agreed to spin off VTech Computers International into an entirely separate company and exit the personal computer market. The resulting company was named PC Partner Limited (later PC Partner Global Limited), resurrecting the name of Leading Edge's budget PC line.
