= Tulip System-1 =

Personal computer made by Tulip Computers

Tulip System I
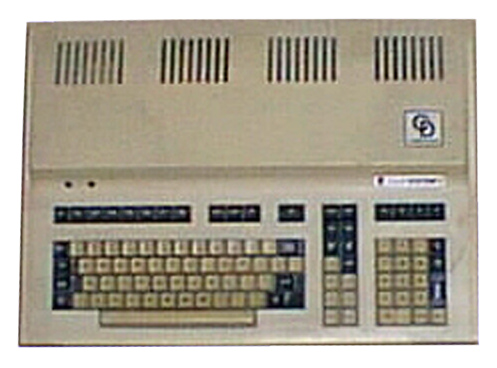
- Tulip System I microcomputer
- Manufacturer: Tulip Computers
- Type: personal computer
- Released: 1983; 43 years ago
- Operating system: CP/M-86, MS-DOS 2.0
- CPU: Intel 8086 @ 8 MHz
- Memory: 128 – 896 KB
- Storage: Optional: 5 or 10 MB hard disk
- Display: Text: 80 × 24 characters and semigraphics; Graphics: 384 × 288 and 768 × 288 color, 768 × 576 monochrome
- Graphics: Motorola 6845 & NEC μPD7220
- Connectivity: RS-232, Parallel port

The Tulip System I is a 16-bit personal computer based on the Intel 8086 and made by Tulip Computers, formerly an import company for the Exidy Sorcerer, called Compudata Systems.

== Hardware ==
Tulip System I is based around the Intel 8086 microprocessor with a 16-bit architecture, running at 8 MHz, almost twice the speed of the IBM PC XT which was launched only a few months earlier in July 1983.

The standard configuration includes 128 KB of RAM, expandable to 896 KB (much more than the 640 KB of the original PC) in units of 128 KB increments.

Its Motorola 6845-based video display controller could display 80 × 24 text in 8 different fonts with support for different languages, including a (Videotex-based) font with pseudo graphic symbols for displaying 160 × 72 pixel graphics in text mode.

The video display generator could also display graphics with a 384 × 288 or 768 × 288 (color) or 768 × 576 (monochrome) pixel resolution using its built-in NEC 7220 video display coprocessor, which had hardware supported drawing functions, with an advanced set of bit-block transfers it could do line generating, arc, circle, ellipse, ellipse arc, filled arc, filled circle, filled ellipse, filled elliptical arc and many other commands.

It has the possibility to use an Intel 8087 math coprocessor, which increased the speed to > 200 kflops, which was near mainframe data at that time.

It included a SASI hard disk interface (a predecessor of the SCSI-standard) and was optionally delivered with a 5 MB or 10 MB hard disk. The floppy disk size was 400 KB (10 sectors, instead of 8 or 9 with the IBM PC) or 800 KB (80 tracks).

== Software ==
After initially using CP/M-86, it quickly switched to using generic MS-DOS 2.00. There was a rudimentary IBM BIOS-emulator, which allowed the user to use WordStar and a few other IBM-PC software, but Compudata B.V. shipped WordStar and some other software as adopted software for this computer. There was programming support by Compudata B.V. with MS-Basic, MS-Pascal and MS-Fortran. On a private base, TeX and Turbo Pascal were ported to the Tulip System I.
