= Exidy Sorcerer =

1978 home computer system

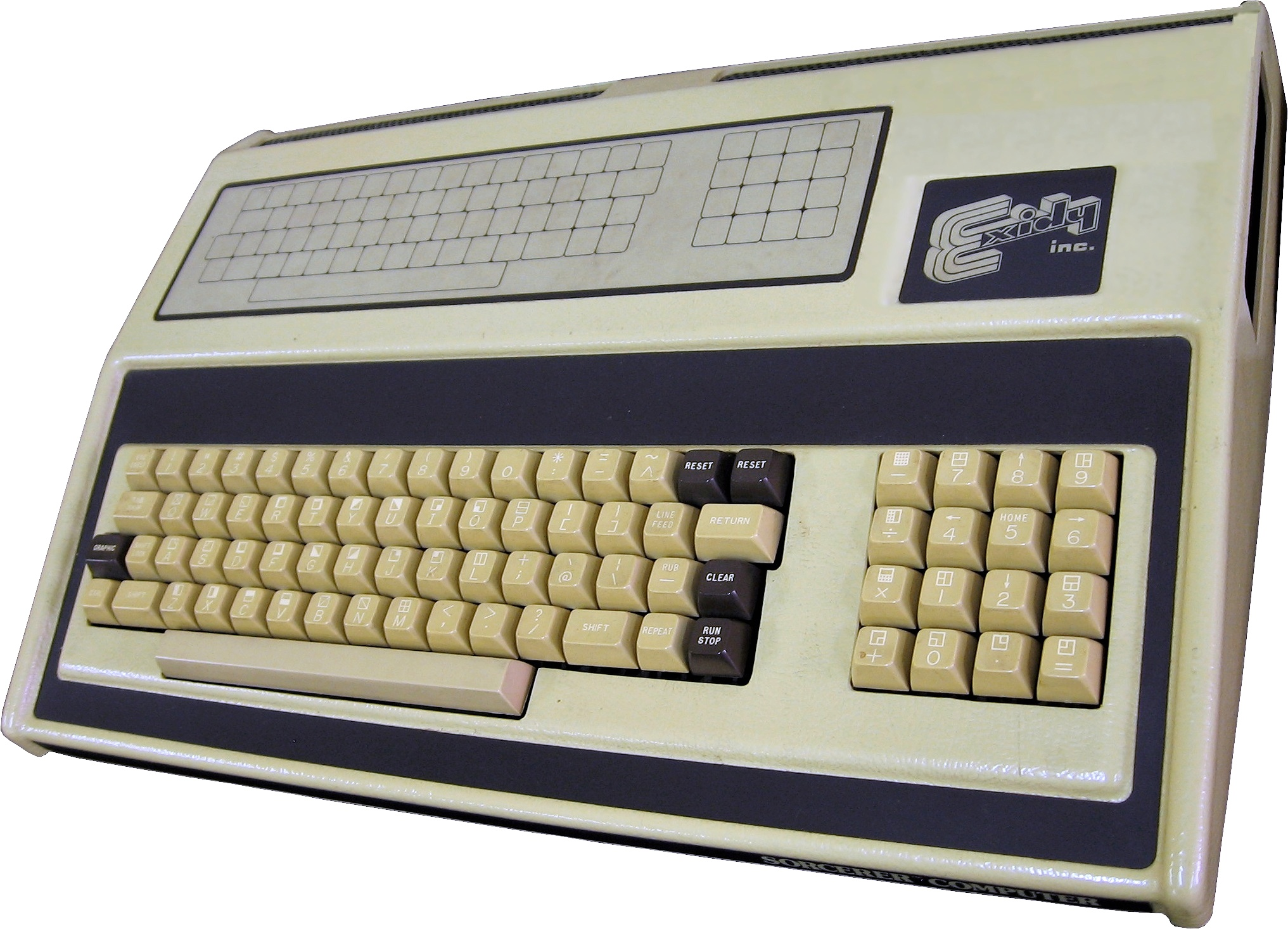
- Manufacturer: Exidy
- Type: Home computer
- Released: 28 April, 1978; 48 years ago
- Lifespan: 1978–1980
- Introductory price: US$895 (equivalent to $4,400 in 2025)
- CPU: Zilog Z80 @ 2.1 MHz
- Memory: Mk I: up to 32 KB on-board RAM; Mk II: up to 48 KB on-board RAM
- Display: 64 × 30 character display, monochrome
- Sound: none (external additions possible)
- Connectivity: composite video, Centronics parallel, RS-232, sound in/out for cassette use, 50-pin ribbon connector including the S-100 bus
- Related: Tulip

The Sorcerer is a home computer system released in 1978 by the video game company Exidy, of Sunnyvale, California, and later marketed as a small business computer system under their Exidy Systems subsidiary. Based on the Zilog Z80 and the general layout of the emerging S-100 standard, the Sorcerer was comparatively advanced when released, and especially when compared to the contemporary and more commercially successful Commodore PET and TRS-80. Sorcerer sales worldwide, of around 20,000 units, is comparable to the TRS-80 model II, both targeting Small or Home Business Computer users. The overall concept originated with Paul Terrell, formerly of the Byte Shop, a pioneering computer store. Coincidentally, the TRS-80 model I was designed by Steve Leininger, a former Byte Shop employee.

Lacking financial investment from its parent company, which was focused on the coin-operated arcade game market, and which, unlike Apple, did not wish to seek venture capital, the Sorcerer was sold primarily through international distributors and technology licensing agreements. Distribution agreements were made with Dick Smith Electronics in Australia and Liveport in the UK, as well as with Compudata in the Netherlands, which included a manufacturing license to build, market and distribute the Sorcerer in Europe. Compudata developed the design into the Tulip line of computers in Europe. The Sorcerer remains relatively unknown outside these markets.

After a deal with Recortec (makers of the TRS-80 clone called "Video Genie" or "PMC-80") fell through in August 1980, Exidy Systems was sold to a venture capital firm, Biotech, in summer 1981, which sold it on to Dynasty Computer Corp., Texas, in February 1982. Dynasty re-branded it as the "smart-ALEC", and sold around 3,000 bundles.

== History ==
=== Origins ===
Paul Terrell was operating RepCo in California, selling power supplies and test instruments to electronics manufacturers. A suggestion by Ed Roberts of MITS led Paul to start one of the first personal computer stores, the Byte Shop, in 1975. By 1977, the first store at El Camino Real in Mountain View, had grown into a chain of 58 stores, which Terrell then sold to John Peers of Logical Machine Corporation.

Prior to selling Byte Shop, Terrell had introduced an S-100 based kit called the Byt8, to be sold alongside the MITS Altair and other S-100 compatible systems.

Terrell, always looking for new ventures, saw a gap in the market for a small business computer that was user-friendly, affordable, came fully equipped, and importantly without the need for any customer-assembly. At the time, the Commodore PET and Tandy TRS-80 offered the out-of-the-box experience he considered essential, yet the TRS-80 required a costly computer monitor, and both machines had low-resolution graphics capabilities. The Apple II had superior graphics and color, but required some user assembly before being operational.

Looking for a suitable name, Terrell noted "Computers are like magic to people, so let's give them computer magic with the Sorcerer computer."

=== Design ===
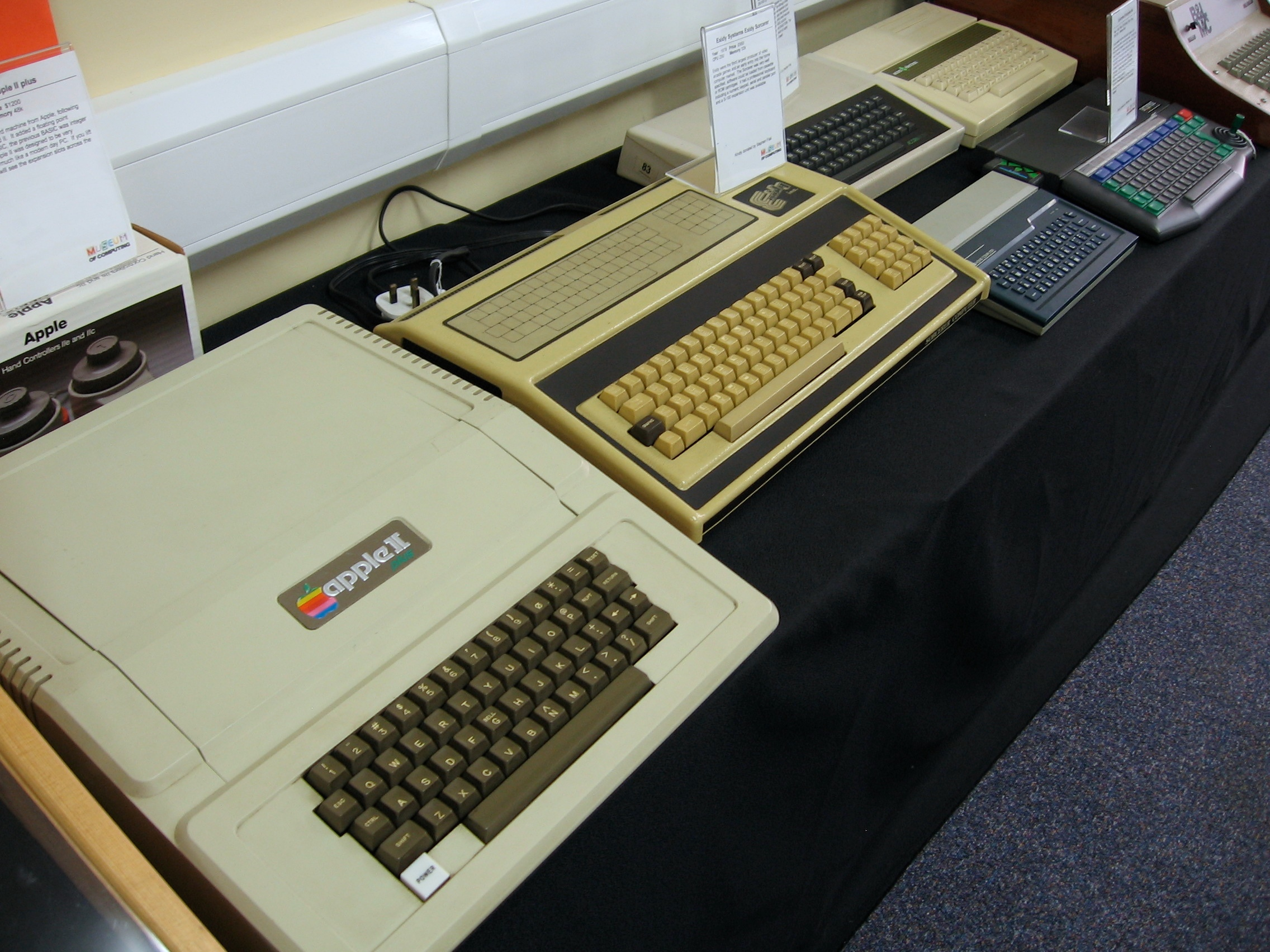
Size comparison of Apple II (left) and Exidy Sorcerer

From his days at RepCo, Terrell knew H.R. "Pete" Kauffman and Howell Ivy of Exidy, a successful coin-operated arcade game manufacturer. Terrell noted "Their graphic designs with a computer were so good they would take quarters out of my pocket." Howell, VP of Engineering, was a computer enthusiast and was interested in Terrell's concept. From its outset, the Sorcerer design was aimed as a small business computer. The wish list of design improvements over existing designs went like this:

- A keyboard computer that could plug into a television set like the Apple II and TRS-80, but also plug into a computer monitor to display high resolution graphics.
- An easily programmable graphics character set like the Commodore PET, so aspiring programmers could write BASIC language programs with graphical user interfaces, like word processors and spreadsheets. The Sorcerer design would have the highest resolution in the marketplace, and innovative because the graphic characters could be reprogrammed to represent any kind of 8x8 character the programmer wanted, unlike the fixed graphic character set on the Commodore PET. Howell did such a good job in this area of the design that it was to achieve a “Most Innovative” award at the Consumer Electronics Show after its introduction.
- The fastest microcomputer chip with the most software compatibility in the marketplace. The Exidy Sorcerer used the Z80 Processor from Zilog Corp. (the same as the TRS-80 from Tandy, while the Apple II and Commodore PET used the 6502 processor from MOS Technology) which allowed it to run the same BASIC language software that was becoming one of the first standards in the personal computer industry, Micro-Soft BASIC. Exidy was one of the first companies to license software from Micro-Soft after they parted ways from MITS, Inc. and before they moved from New Mexico to Seattle to become Microsoft.
- Plug-In software cartridges so the computer user could immediately begin using the computer at power-on. The user would not have to load a program from tape or disk to start operating the computer. Exidy would provide three program cartridges under license: Microsoft 8K BASIC, Word Processor Cartridge (which was seen as the “Killer App“ for Exidy, as the Spreadsheet was to Apple), and an Assembler Cartridge (for programmers to write their own custom software for proprietary applications). Blank EPROM cartridges were provided for custom applications, for which design possibly had in mind foreign language character sets that would have helped to make the Exidy Sorcerer more internationally popular.
- An expansion unit designed to the industry standard S-100 bus so that all of the low cost peripheral products then currently available could be attached to expand the computer system. This would allow a Sorcerer system to expand as its small business user grew.

=== Launch in the US ===
The Sorcerer made its debut at the Long Beach Computer Show on 28 April, 1978. The standard plug-in attachments to the keyboard case (included in the base price of the unit) were a printer port for hard copy devices, cassette port for mass storage, and serial port for communications. Some of these interfaces were included with competing products and some were add-on.

The Exidy Sorcerer was competitively priced at $895 and went to market in Long Beach, California in April 1978 and generated a 4,000 unit back-log on introduction. Shipments did not start until later that summer.

=== Successes outside the US ===
Export of personal computers was complicated by the requirement of US Government State Department approval but this was more than offset by the financial advantage afforded by the customary export terms of sale under letter of credit, yielding immediate cash, as compared to chasing payments from domestic retailers on 30-day credit terms. Exidy was thus keen to concentrate on international sales though recognizing the importance of its US presence for development and marketing purposes.

Exidy took this to another level by licensing production both domestically and internationally, increasing total production and market penetration without calling on cash flow. With its unique programmable character set for foreign language characters, the Exidy Sorcerer was in a league of its own. Advance royalty payments and license fees made this business a priority for Exidy, Inc.

The first Sorcerers sold in the UK were imported direct from the US by a small company based in Cornwall called Liveport Ltd. The base price was £895 (equivalent to £4,900 in 2025). Liveport also eventually designed and built extra plug-in ROM-PAC cartridges and an add-on floppy disk drive (based on Micropolis units) that did not require the expensive S-100 chassis. Sorcerer sales in continental Europe were fairly strong, via their distributor, Compudata Systems. The machine had its greatest commercial success in 1979 when the Dutch broadcasting company TELEAC, in a move to be emulated later by the BBC with its BBC Micro, decided to introduce its own home computer. The Belgian company DAI was originally contracted to design the machine but they failed to deliver and Compudata delivered several thousand Sorcerers instead.

Sales in Europe were strong and, when the Dutch Government endorsed computers for small business, Compudata decided to license the Exidy design for local construction in the Netherlands with government support. After several years of Exidy production, Compudata developed their own 16-bit Intel 8088–based machine called the Tulip, replacing the Sorcerer in 1983. One of the largest computing user groups in the Netherlands was the ESGG (Exidy Sorcerer Gebruikers Groep) which published a monthly newsletter in two editions, Dutch and English. For some time, they were the largest group in the HCC (Hobby Computer Club) federation. The Dutch company De Broeders Montfort was a major firmware manufacturer.

The Sorcerer was successful in Australia as a result of strong promotion by its exclusive agent Dick Smith Electronics, though there was price resistance as it was considered beyond the means of most hobbyists. The Sorcerer Computer Users group of Australia (SCUA) actively supported the Sorcerer long after Exidy discontinued it, with RAM upgrades, speed boosts, the "80-column card", and even a replacement monitor program, SCUAMON.

== Description ==
The Sorcerer design combined elements of the popular MITS-derived S-100 bus architecture, not yet standardised, with custom display and i/o circuitry, all housed within a custom "closed" case. The ROM-pac idea came from Howell Ivy's days at Ramtek, where he started working on arcade games before joining Exidy. The machine included the Zilog Z80 and various bus features needed to run the CP/M operating system; a port of CP/M was done by the four-man software team at Exidy led by Vic Tolomei, in consultation with Digital Research. The "closed" case featured a built-in keyboard similar to later machines like the Commodore 64, and the Atari 8-bit computers. The Sorcerer's keyboard was a high quality unit with full "throw". The keyboard included a custom "Graphics" key, which allowed easy entry of the extended character set, without having to overwork the Control key, the more common solution on other machines. Leading its peers, the Sorcerer included lower-case characters in ROM, as well as user-programmable characters stored in RAM.

Unlike most S-100 CP/M machines of its era, the Sorcerer did not have any internal expansion slots, and everything that was needed for basic computing was built-in. A standard video monitor was required for display, and optionally a standard audio cassette deck was needed for data storage. The Sorcerer included a small ROM containing a simple monitor program, written by John Borders, which allowed the machine to be controlled at the machine language level, as well as load programs from cassette tape or cartridges. The cartridges, known as "ROM PAC"s in Exidy-speak, were built by replacing the internal tape in an eight-track tape cartridge with a circuit board and edge connector to interface with the Sorcerer. These allowed the Sorcerer to run applications immediately on start-up, rather than having to load them from tape cassette like its peers.

The machine was usable without any expansion, but if the user wished to use S-100 cards they could do so with an external expansion chassis. This was plugged in via a 50-way ribbon cable to the expansion slot in the rear of the Sorcerer. The Exidy S-100 chassis is a large external cage which included a full set of S-100 slots, allowing the Sorcerer to be used as a "full" S-100 machine.

Using the same S-100 expansion slot, a user could directly attach floppy disks and boot from them into CP/M (without which the disks were not operable). A later form factor of the Sorcerer combined the floppies, and a small monitor into a single box, that resembled the TRS-80 model II. A Winchester drive was also later offered.

=== Graphics ===
Graphics on the Sorcerer were impressive, with a resolution of 512 × 240, when most machines of the era supported a maximum of 320 × 200. These lower resolutions were a side effect of the inability of the video hardware to read the screen data from RAM fast enough; given the slow speed of the machines they would end up spending all of their time driving the display. The key to building a usable system was to reduce the total amount of data, either by reducing the resolution, or by reducing the number of colors.

The Sorcerer instead chose another method entirely, which was to use definable character graphics. There were 256 characters to choose from for each screen location. The Sorcerer character set was divided into two halves: the lower half was fixed in ROM and contained the usual ASCII character set; while the upper half was defined in a dedicated region of RAM. This character RAM would be loaded with a default set of graphics from ROM at reset, but could be re-programmed and used in lieu of pixel-addressable graphics. In fact, the machine was actually drawing a 64 × 30 display (8 × 8 pixel characters) which was well within the capabilities of the hardware. However, this meant that all graphics had to lie within a checkerboard pattern on the screen, and the system was generally less flexible than machines with "real" graphics. In addition, the high resolution was well beyond the capability of the average color TV, a problem they solved by not supporting color. In this respect the Sorcerer was similar to the PET and TRS-80 in that it had only "graphics characters" to draw with. Given these limitations, the quality of the graphics on the Sorcerer was otherwise excellent. The programmable character RAM offered significant advantages, which included the ability to provide a form of animation by re-defining individual character bitmaps at runtime. Clever use of several characters for each graphic allowed programmers to create smooth motion on the screen, regardless of the character-cell boundaries.

=== Sound ===
A surprising limitation, given the machine's genesis, is the lack of sound output. Enterprising developers standardized on use of two pins of the parallel port, to which users could attach a speaker.

=== Software ===
A Standard BASIC cartridge was included with the machine. This cartridge was essentially the common Microsoft BASIC already widely used in the CP/M world. One modification was the addition of single-stroke replacements for common BASIC commands, pressing GRAPHICS-P would insert the word PRINT for instance, allowing for higher-speed entry. The machine included sound in/out ports on the back that could be attached to a cassette tape recorder, so BASIC could load and save programs to tape without needing a disk drive. An Extended BASIC cartridge requiring 16 KB was also advertised, but it is unclear if this was actually available; Extended BASIC from Microsoft was available on cassette. Another popular cartridge was the Word Processor PAC which contained a version of the early word processor program Spellbinder.

=== Third Party Add-ons ===
Numerous third party hardware and software applications were developed for the Sorcerer and the S-100 bus. Examples include:

- The Montfort Brothers made an EPROM PAC with a rechargeable battery inside and 16 KB RAM with an external write-protect switch. Thus bootable software could be uploaded to the pack and kept for a longer period.
- Montfort also made a general purpose IO (GPIO) ROM PAC, which includes 8K RAM and an I/O port with individually- or group-addressable I/O lines.
- Prime Designs in the UK makes a programmable EPROM/RAM pack. https://www.exidysorcerer.net/index.html/viewtopic.php?t=36
- Dreamdisk Floppy Disk Controller (with CP/M 2.2) was developed in Australia for the Microbee and Sorcerer computers. There is a modern re-creation available on Github of the Dreamdisk Floppy Controller. https://github.com/RetroStack/Sorcerer_DreamDisk
- Morrow Designs (Thinker Toys) offered a specialized version of their S-100 based "Disk Jockey 2D" 8in floppy drive controller for the Exidy Sorcerer. The firmware was located at D000H instead of the stock E000H and included a customized 24k CP/M BIOS + boot firmware. Morrow similarly offered a customized version for the SOL-20 computer. While this Morrow 8in drive system was very popular back in the late 1970s to early 1980s within the CP/M community, not many Sorcerer owners used it due to the competition from Exidy themselves and from the popular dual Micropolis drive systems.

Numerous active user groups, particularly in Australia (SCUA), Toronto Canada (Port FE - SUGT), the Netherlands (ESGG), the U.K. (ESC) and the U.S. (SUG), published regular newsletters including The Sorcerer's Apprentice. Many of these can be found in the various internet archives, see links below.

=== RAM expansion ===
Many CP/M machines were designed to allow the full 16-bit address space of 64 KB to be populated by memory. This was problematic on the Exidy Sorcerer. 32 KB could easily be populated. Another 16 KB was the ROM cartridge address space. This could be populated, but required disabling the ROM cartridge capability. The last 16 KB was required by the system for I/O, particularly for the video, and would have required extensive system modification.

=== Games ===
There are 50 commercial games for the Exidy Sorcerer.

Name	Year	Publisher
Adventure #1: Adventureland	1979	Creative Computing Soft.
Adventure #2: Pirate Adventure	1979	Creative Computing Soft.
Adventure #3: Mission Impossible	1979	Creative Computing Soft.
Adventure #4: Voodoo Castle	1979	Creative Computing Soft.
Adventure #5: The Count	1979	Creative Computing Soft.
Adventure #6: Strange Odyssey	1979	Creative Computing Soft.
Adventure #7: Mystery Fun House	1979	Creative Computing Soft.
Adventure #8: Pyramid of Doom	1979	Creative Computing Soft.
Adventure #9: Ghost Town	1979	Creative Computing Soft.
Adventureland Model X-3633	198?	Dick Smith Electronics
Air Traffic Controller	1979	Creative Computing Soft.
Air Traffic Controller (Mt Purscent)	198?	Creative Computing Soft.
Armored Patrol	1981	Adventure International
Arrows and Alleys	1980	Quality Soft.
Astro Attacker	1982	Customized Technology
Astro Invasion	198?	System Soft.
BlackJack	1979	Customized Technology
Blackjack Model X-3610	198?	Dick Smith Electronics
Checkers	198?	Creative Computing Soft.
Chomp	1981	Global Soft. Network
Defender	1982	System Soft.
Dodgem	198?	Creative Computing Soft.
Fastgammon	1979	Quality Soft.
Flip	1979	Customized Technology
Galaxian	1978	Exidy
Galaxians	198?	System Soft.
Grotnik Wars	198?	System Soft.
Head-on Collision	1980	Quality Soft.
Home Run	1979	Customized Technology
House of Seven Gables	1978	Mad Hatter Software
Interceptor	1983	System Soft.
Journey to the Center of the Earth	1979	Mad Hatter Software
Kilopede	1982	System Soft.
Lander Arcade	198?	System Soft.
Magic Maze	1979	Quality Soft.
Martian Invaders	1980	Quality Soft.
Military Encounter	1981	Global Soft. Network
Munch	1982	System Soft.
Nike II	1980	Quality Soft.
Nuclear Reaction	198?	Creative Computing Soft.
Orb of Halucidon	1982	System Soft.
Pie Lob	198?	Creative Computing Soft.
Sargon Chess	1979	Hayden Software
Sorcerer Asteroids	1980	Customized Technology
Sorcerer Invaders	1980	System Soft.
Starfighter	1981	Adventure International
Super Asteroids	1981	System Soft.
Super Space Battle	198?	Creative Computing Soft.
Tank Trap IV	1979	Quality Soft.
Wilderness	198?	Dick Smith Electronics

== Exidy Systems ==
After the deal to sell the Exidy Data System Division to Recortec fell through in August 1980, Exidy Systems was incorporated in January 1981, with the express purpose to sell the Sorcerer design rights and business unit off.

Terrell continued to evolve system designs that would grow with small business-users. The System 80 Desktop Computer of 1981 combined the Sorcerer with a 12" display, dot matrix printer and business software, for which the contemporary benchmark was perhaps the Xerox Diablo 3100. This was followed by the Multi-Net 80 also in 1981, using multiple Winchester disk drives, a centralised "timeshare global module" running MP/M and CP/NET, to which up to 16 Sorcerers with a Terminal ROM PAC inserted could inter-connect. These were early networked systems, although it is not clear if any of these were ever sold. This is the timeframe when Exidy Systems was sold to Biotech. Terrell departed Exidy Systems in January 1982.
