= Apple I =

Computer model built by Apple

Apple Computer 1

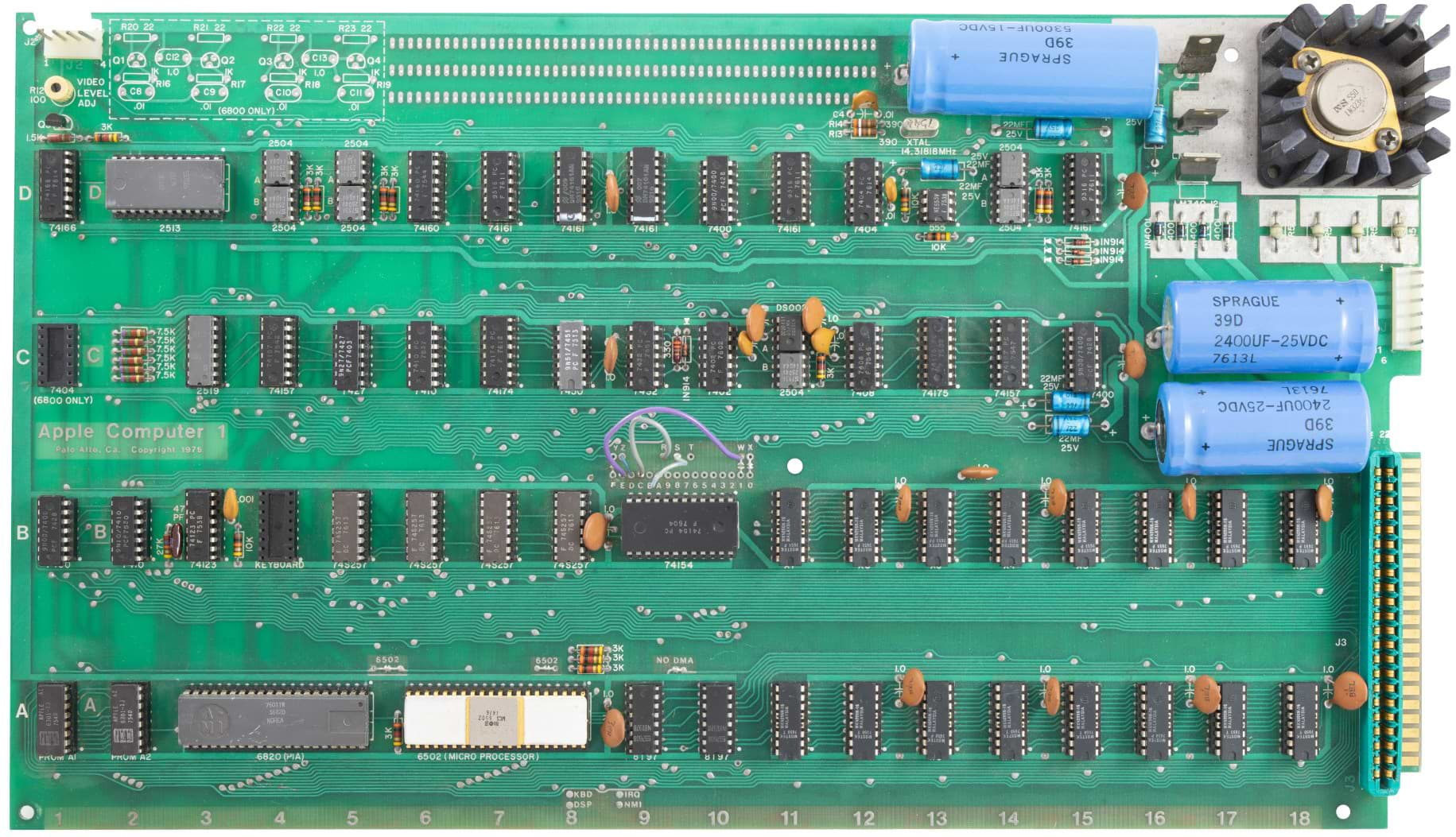
- Apple 1 motherboard (annotated version)
- Also known as: Apple I, Apple-1
- Developer: Steve Wozniak
- Manufacturer: Apple Computer Company
- Type: Motherboard-only personal computer kit
- Released: July 1976; 50 years ago
- Introductory price: US$666.66 (equivalent to $3,770 in 2025)
- Discontinued: September 30, 1977; 49 years ago
- Units sold: c. 175 to 200
- Operating system: Custom system monitor
- CPU: MOS Technology 6502 @ 1.023 MHz
- Memory: 4 or 8 KB
- Storage: 256 B ROM
- Removable storage: Cassette tape
- Graphics: 40×24 characters, hardware-implemented scrolling (Signetics 2513 "64×8×5 Character Generator")
- Marketing target: Early hobbyist
- Successor: Apple II
- Made in: USA

The Apple Computer 1 (Apple-1), (Note: The name is abbreviated as Apple-1 in original manuals and documentation.) often referred to as the Apple I(written with a Roman numeral), (Note: Apple retroactively refers to the computer as Apple I, beginning with catalogs from 1977.) is an 8-bit personal computer designed by Steve Wozniak and introduced by the Apple Computer Company (now Apple Inc.) in 1976. It was the company's first product and laid the foundation for what would become one of the world's largest technology companies. The idea of founding the company and marketing the computer came from Wozniak's friend and Apple co-founder Steve Jobs.

Unlike most contemporary hobbyist computers, which were sold as kits requiring assembly, the Apple-1 was delivered as a pre-assembled motherboard with built-in video display terminal circuitry. This allowed it to connect directly to a household television using a composite video cable, eliminating the need for an expensive external terminal. Users still had to supply a case, power supply, and keyboard. Powered by the MOS Technology 6502 microprocessor, it was among the earliest personal computers to offer these capabilities, alongside the Sol-20.

After demonstrating a prototype at the Homebrew Computer Club, Jobs secured an order for 50 computers from the Byte Shop, enabling production of the Apple-1. It was discontinued on September 30, 1977, following the introduction of the Apple II. Because relatively few Apple-1 computers were produced and its status as Apple's first product, surviving Apple I units are now displayed in computer museums and demand high prices at auction.

== History ==
=== Development ===
In 1974, while visiting John Draper, a well-known phone phreak, Steve Wozniak watched Draper connect a modem to the ARPANET—the precursor to the Internet—and use a teleprinter to play chess with someone in Boston. The demonstration inspired Wozniak to design and build a low-cost computer terminal for his own use that could connect to a standard television and use an inexpensive keyboard from Sears.

In March 1975, Wozniak began attending meetings of the Homebrew Computer Club, where newly introduced microcomputers such as the Altair 8800 inspired him to incorporate a microprocessor into his terminal, creating a complete computer for his own personal use. He initially planned to use the Motorola 6800, but its US$175 (Note: equivalent to $1,050 in 2025) price made it prohibitively expensive. The introduction of the MOS Technology 6502 in late 1975 for just $25 (Note: equivalent to $150 in 2025) made the design economically feasible. Because the 6502 shared much of its architecture with the 6800, Wozniak was able to adapt his earlier design. The computer could be converted to run on 6800 or MOS 6501 processors by populating a clock circuit at the top left of the board.

By March 1, 1976, Wozniak had completed the basic design of the computer. He first offered it to his employer, Hewlett-Packard (HP), but the company rejected the design on five occasions. Wozniak's intention remained to freely distribute the computer's schematics to fellow hobbyists rather than manufacture or sell it commercially. After seeing it demonstrated at the Homebrew Computer Club, Wozniak's friend and fellow club member Steve Jobs recognized its commercial potential and persuaded Wozniak to start a company and sell printed circuit boards (PCBs) for hobbyists to assemble themselves.

Apple Computer was founded as a partnership on April 1, 1976, by Wozniak, Jobs, and Ronald Wayne. To finance production of the first circuit boards, Wozniak sold his HP-65 calculator while Jobs sold his Volkswagen Type 2 microbus. Together, they raised about $1,300. (Note: a price equivalent to $7780 in 2025)

External images
- Byte Shop storefront
- The prototype shown to Terrell
- Wozniak and Jobs with an Apple I

Wozniak and Jobs demonstrated the fully assembled "Apple Computer A" prototype at the Homebrew Computer Club in July 1976. Paul Terrell, who was starting a new computer shop in Mountain View, California, called the Byte Shop, saw the presentation and was impressed by the machine. Terrell told Jobs that he would order 50 units of the Apple I and pay $500 each (Note: equivalent to $2,800 in 2025) on delivery, but only if they came fully assembled – he was not interested in buying bare printed circuit boards with no components.

Wozniak had designed the electrical circuit, but the board design for the Apple 1 was done by Howard Cantin, a PCB layout engineer at Atari, where Jobs had worked.

Jobs took the purchase order from the Byte Shop to national electronic parts distributor Cramer Electronics, and ordered the components needed. When asked by the credit manager how he would pay for the parts, Jobs replied, "I have this purchase order from the Byte Shop chain of computer stores for 50 of my computers and the payment terms are COD. If you give me the parts on net 30-day terms I can build and deliver the computers in that time frame, collect my money from Terrell at the Byte Shop and pay you."

To verify the purchase order, the credit manager called Terrell, who assured him if the computers showed up, Jobs would have enough money for the parts order. The two Steves and their small crew spent day and night building and testing the computers, and delivered to Terrell on time. Terrell was surprised to receive a batch of assembled circuit boards, as he had expected complete computers with a case, monitor and keyboard. Nonetheless, he kept his word and paid the two Steves the money promised.

=== Announcement and sales ===
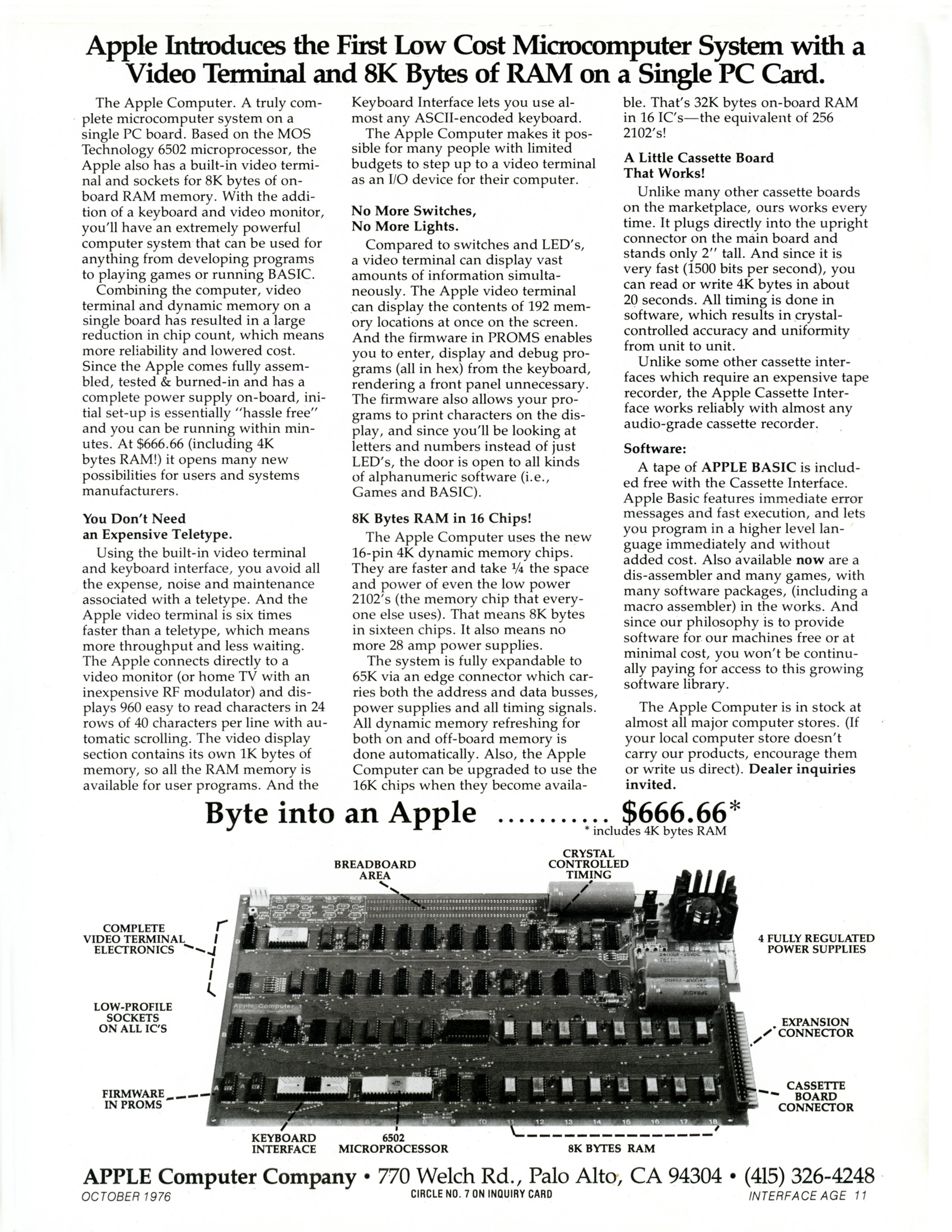
Introductory advertisement for the Apple I computer

The Apple I went on sale in July 1976 at a price of US$666.66. (Note: equivalent to $3,800 in 2025) Wozniak later said he had no idea about the relation between the number and the number of the beast, and that he came up with the price because he liked "repeating digits" and because it was a one-third markup on the $500 wholesale price. Jobs worked to get the inventory into the nation's first four storefront microcomputer retailers: Byte Shop (Palo Alto, California), itty bitty machine company (Evanston, Illinois), Data Domain (Bloomington, Indiana), and Computer Mart (New York City).

The first unit produced was used in a high school math class, and donated to Liza Loop's public-access computer center. About 200 units were produced, and all but 25 were sold within nine or ten months.

In April 1977, the price was dropped to $475. (Note: equivalent to $2,500 in 2025) It continued to be sold through August 1977, despite the introduction of the Apple II in April 1977, which began shipping in June of that year. In October 1977, the Apple I was officially discontinued and removed from Apple's price list. As Wozniak was the only person who could answer most customer support questions about the computer, the company offered Apple I owners discounts and trade-ins for Apple IIs to persuade them to return their computers. These recovered boards were then destroyed by Apple, contributing to their later rarity.

Both Jobs and Wozniak have stated that Apple did not assign serial numbers to the Apple l. Several boards have been found with numbered stickers affixed to them, which appear to be inspection stickers from the PCB manufacturer/assembler. A batch of boards is known to have numbers hand-written in black permanent marker on the back; these usually appear as "01-00##". As of January 2022, 29 Apple-1s with a serial number are known. The highest known number is 01–0079. Two original Apple-1s have been analyzed by Professional Sports Authenticator in Los Angeles, concluding that the serial numbers had been hand-written by Jobs.

== Hardware ==
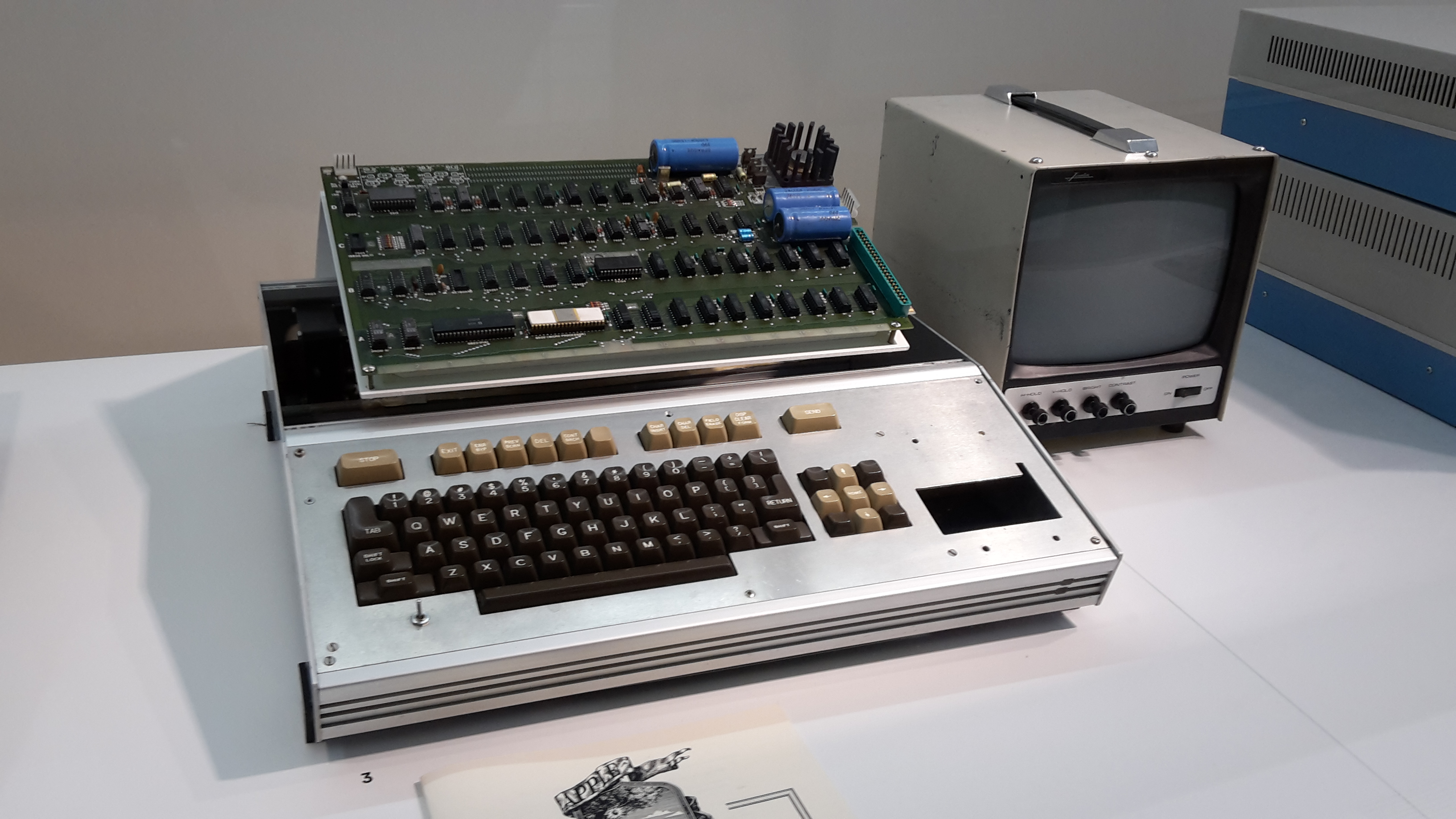
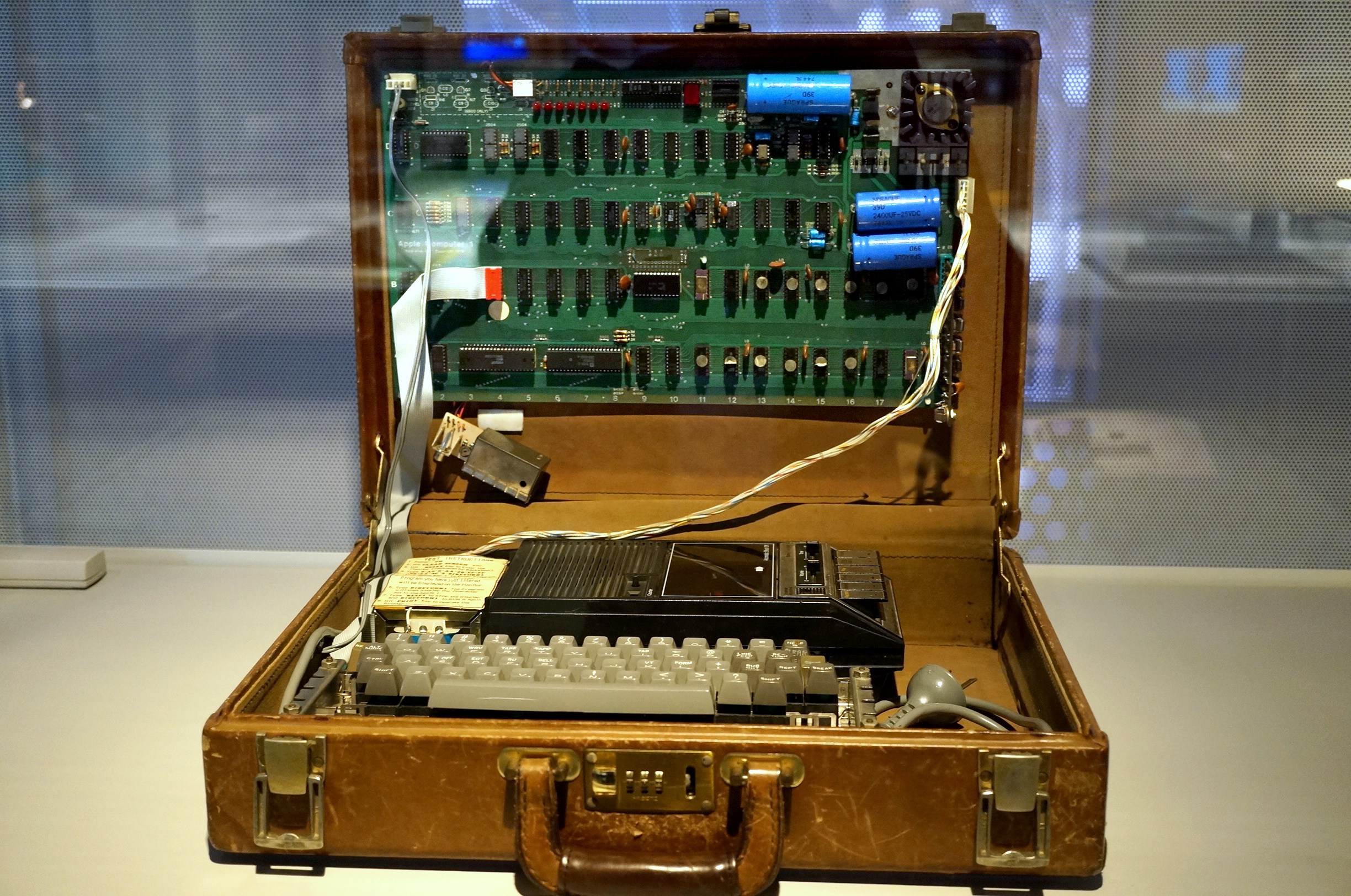
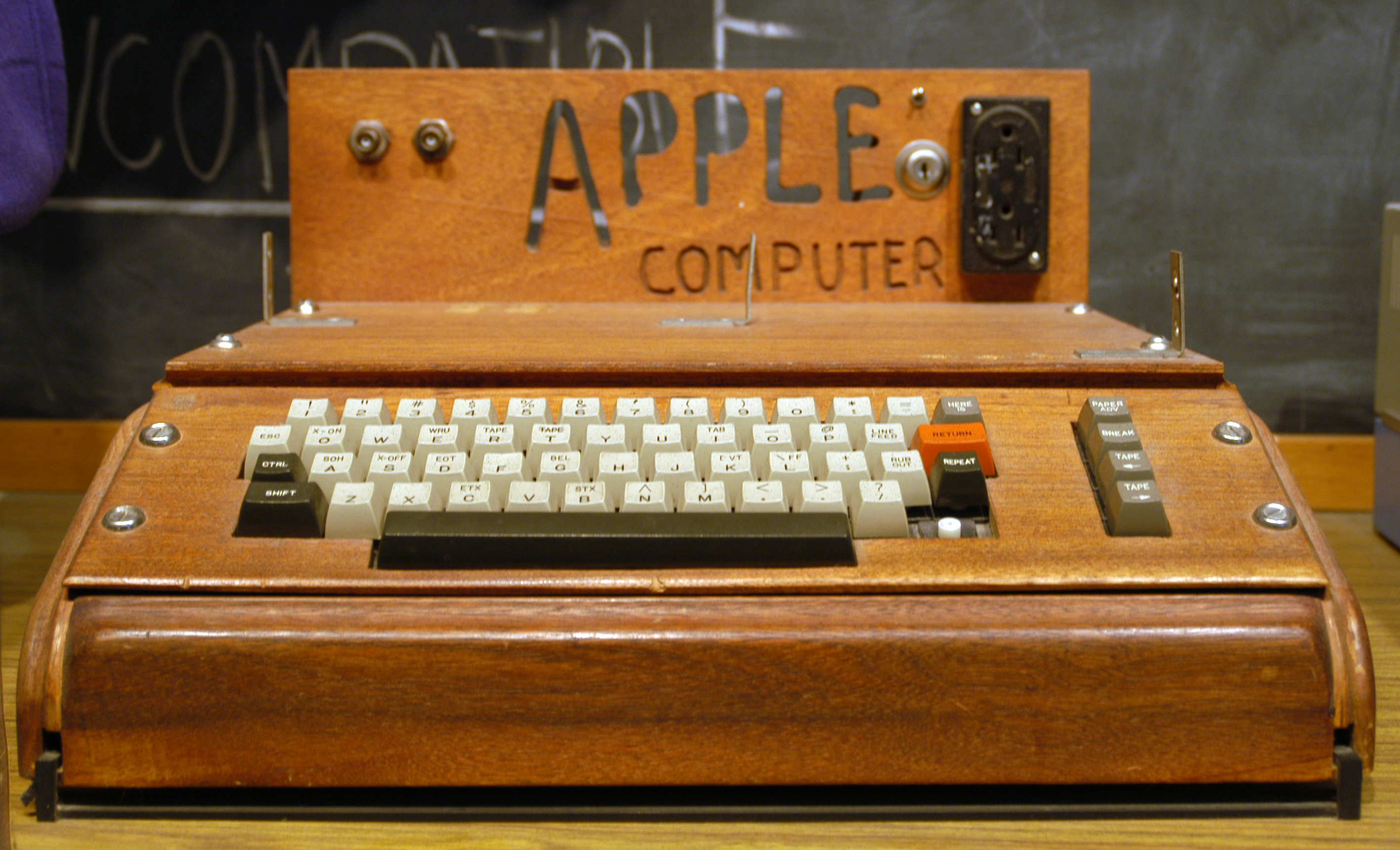
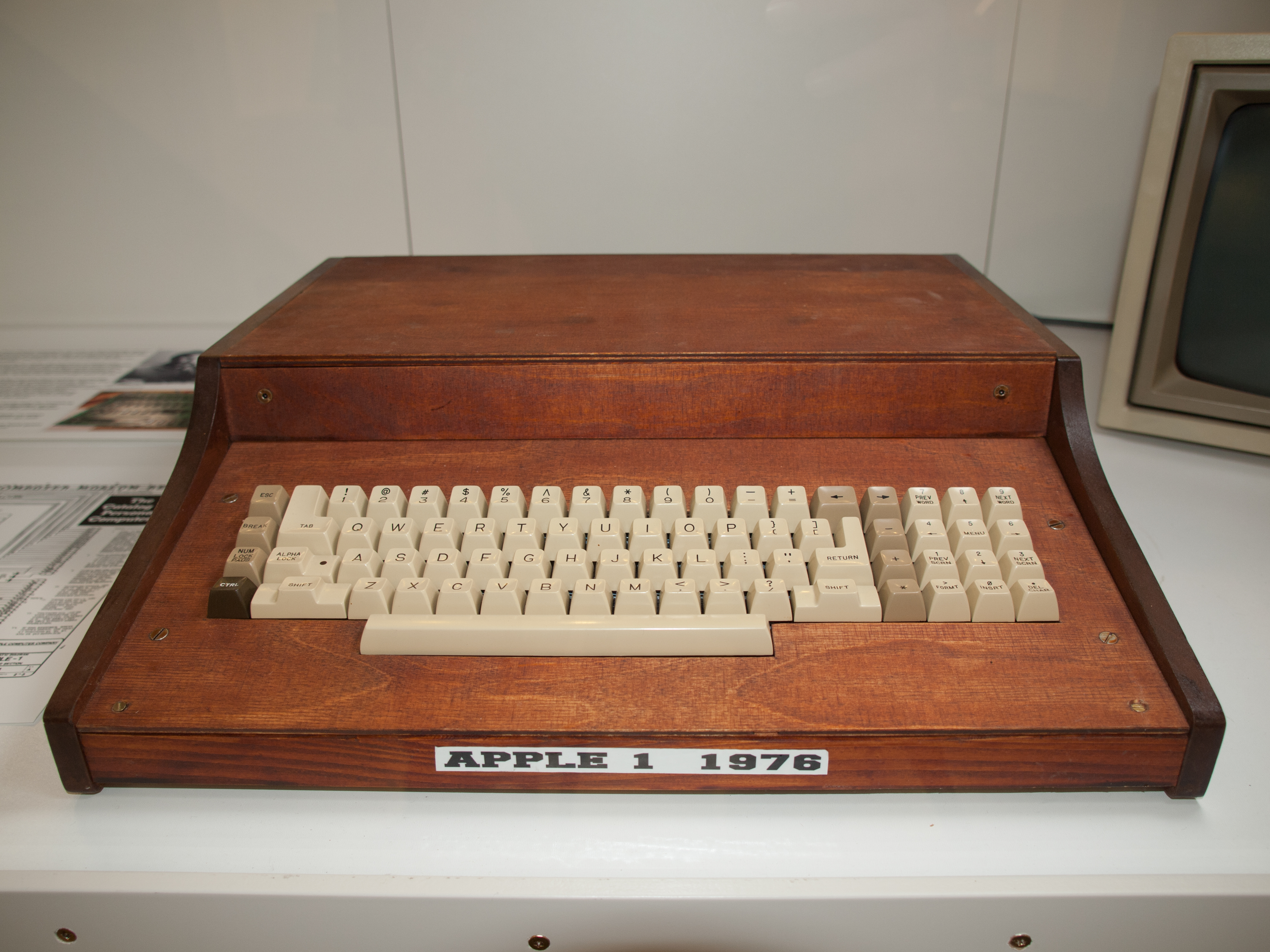
A variety of Apple I cases. The computer did not include a case, and no official case was produced, so customers had to supply their own.

The Apple I used a MOS Technology 6502 microprocessor running at 1.022727 MHz, and its design was based largely on Wozniak's previous work centered around a Motorola 6800. The unconventional clock speed was chosen as it was a fraction (2/7) of the NTSC color carrier, which simplified video circuitry. 4 KB of memory was included on the base machine, which was expandable to 8 KB on-board and up to 64 KB by using an add-on card. On-board memory utilized newly available 4Kbit DRAM chips, and was designed to be upgradeable to the next generation of 16Kbit chips for a maximum of 32 KB on-board memory. An optional $75 plug-in cassette interface card could be used to store programs on ordinary audio cassette tapes. A BASIC interpreter, originally written by Wozniak, was provided with the cassette interface to allow customers to write programs.

The Apple I did not come with a case. It could be used bare, although some users chose to build custom (typically wooden) enclosures.

=== Memory map ===
The Apple I system monitor ready prompt

Address	Size (in B)	Description	Notes
0x0000–0x0023	36	RAM	4K systems (minimal system, cannot load wozbasic)
0x0024–0x002B	8	wozmon variables	4K systems (minimal system, cannot load wozbasic)
0x002C–0x00FF	212	RAM	4K systems (minimal system, cannot load wozbasic)
0x0100–0x01FF	256	6502 processor stack	4K systems (minimal system, cannot load wozbasic)
0x0200–0x027F	128	wozmon keyboard input buffer	4K systems (minimal system, cannot load wozbasic)
0x0280–0x0FFF	3456	RAM	4K systems (minimal system, cannot load wozbasic)
0x1000–0xC027		Unused	User expandable RAM / IO
0xC028	1 Byte	ACI port to write to cassette	
0xC029–0xC0FF		Unused	User expandable RAM / IO
0xC100–0xC1FF	256	ACI ROM	When ACI card is inserted
0xC200–0xD00F		Unused	User expandable RAM / IO
0xD010–0xD013	4	PIA (Peripheral Interface Adapter)	Keyboard and Display
0xD014–0xDFFF		Unused	User expandable RAM / IO
0xE000–0xEFFF	4096	RAM	8K systems (standard system, can load wozbasic)
0xF000–0xFEFF		Unused	User expandable RAM / IO
0xFF00–0xFFFF	256	PROM (wozmon)	Programmable read-only memory

=== Video and Input ===
The Apple I included built-in computer terminal circuitry with composite video output. To use the computer, a user-supplied composite monitor and ASCII-encoded keyboard needed to be connected. If a monitor was not available, a standard television set could be used along with an RF modulator. In comparison, competing machines generally required an expensive dedicated video display terminal or teletypewriter. This, combined with its single-board construction, made the Apple I an elegant and inexpensive machine for its day, though competitors such as the Sol-20 and Sphere 1 offered similar feature sets.

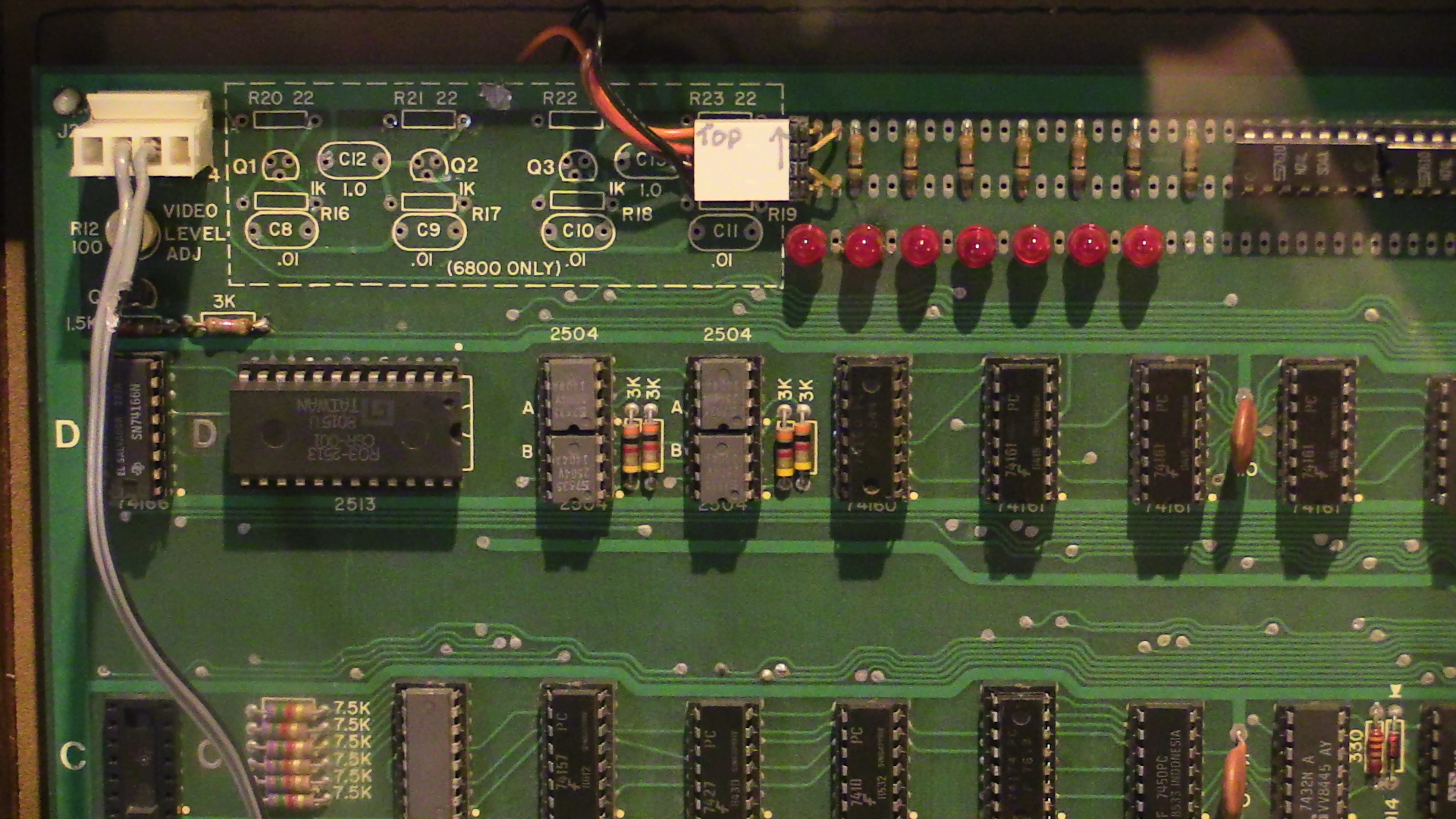
The large, horizontal chip on the top-left of the main board is the Signetics 2513 character generator.

The Apple I character set

The computer generated its video output using a shift register memory and a Signetics 2513 64×8×5 Character Generator. It was capable of displaying uppercase characters, numbers and basic punctuation and math symbols with a 5x8 pixel font:

Signetics 2513
	0	1	2	3	4	5	6	7	8	9	A	B	C	D	E	F
0x 0	@	A	B	C	D	E	F	G	H	I	J	K	L	M	N	O
1x 16	P	Q	R	S	T	U	V	W	X	Y	Z	[	\	]		_
2x 32	SP	!	"	#	$	%	&	'	(	)	*	+	,	-	.	/
3x 48	0	1	2	3	4	5	6	7	8	9	:	;	<	=	>	?

Symbols and punctuation

=== Apple Cassette Interface expansion ===
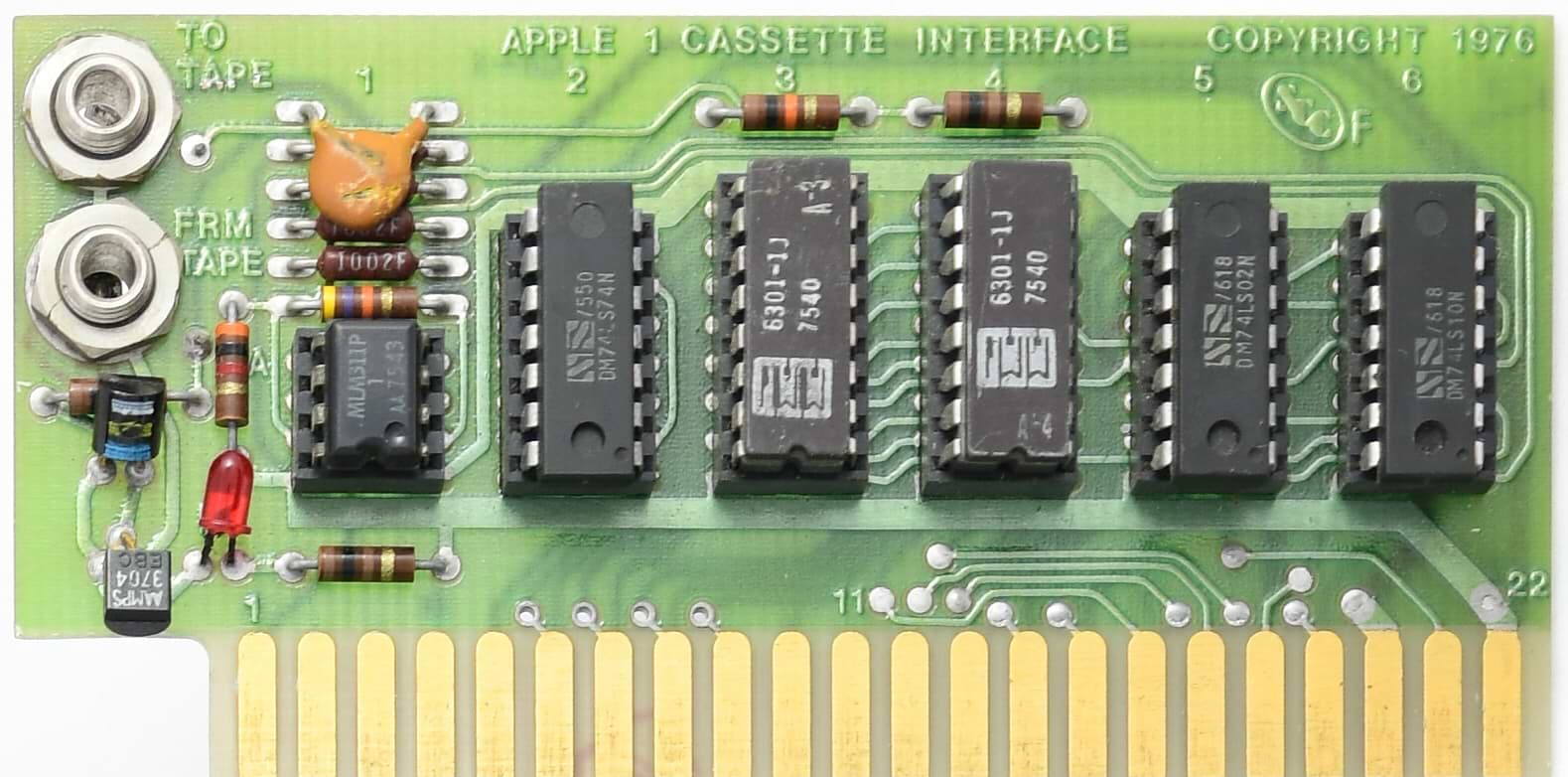
- The Apple Cassette Interface expansion card. There are two phone connector ports for reading and writing programs to a connected cassette deck.
- Apple BASIC cassette tape This cassette tape was distributed with the Apple I. Playing this file into an Apple Cassette Interface will load Apple BASIC.

A cassette interface was available in the form of an optional add-on card for the Apple I's expansion slot. A cassette deck plugged in to the card's phone connector ports could be written to and read from as a form of removable storage. The only alternative to the interface for loading programs was typing machine code by hand, making the add-on "ubiquitous". The expansion came with a free cassette tape containing Steve Wozniak's Integer BASIC interpreter. Other software tapes were available "at minimal cost" including ported video games such as Hamurabi, Lunar Lander and Star Trek.

== Conservation ==
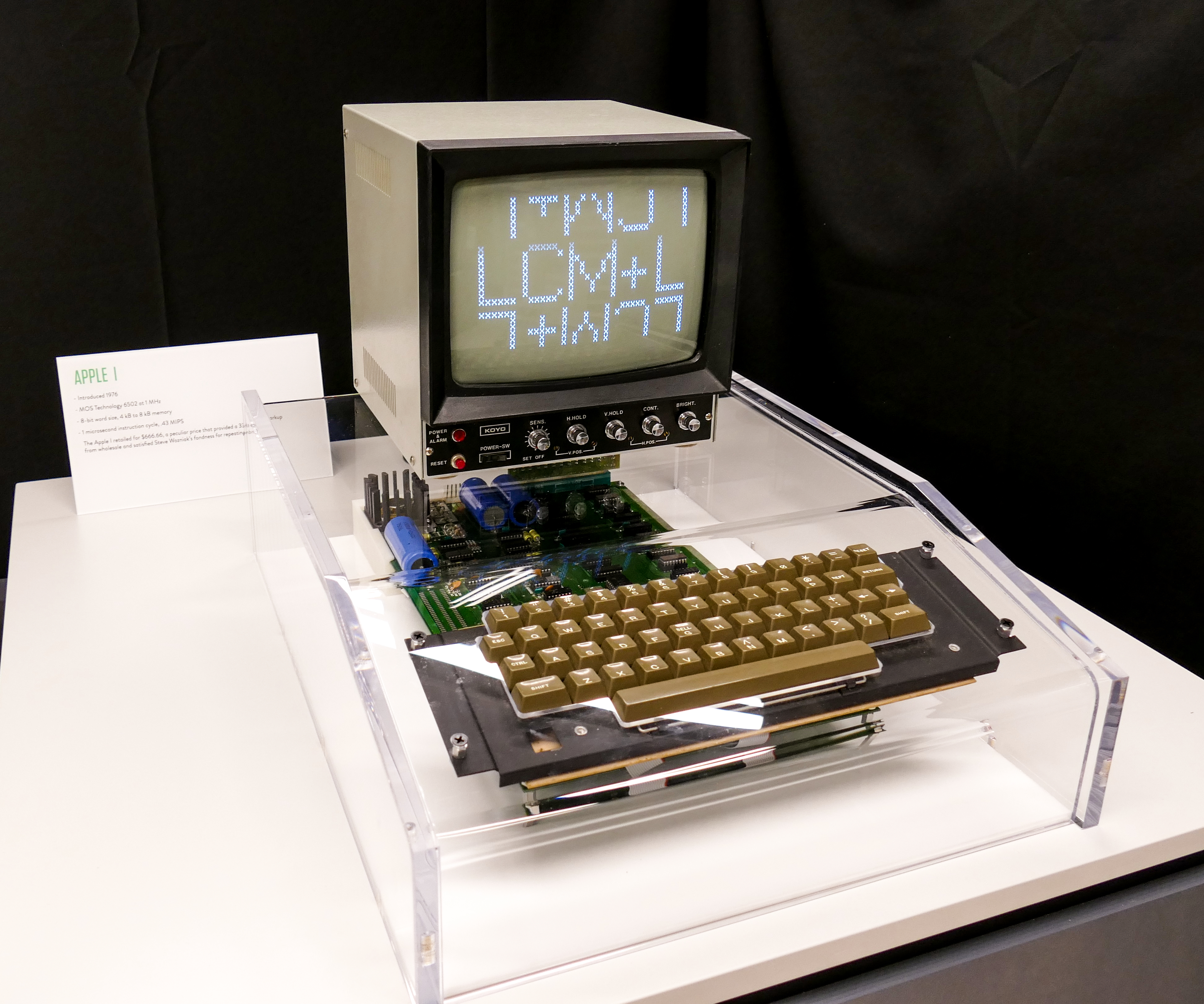
A running Apple I, with a keyboard and monitor connected, on display at LCM+L where guests were allowed to use it

Only about 200 Apple I computers were produced, and as of August 2022, between 62 and 82 were known to survive. To reduce support costs, Apple encouraged owners to trade in their computers, offering increasingly generous incentives. The offers initially consisted of a discount on an Apple II, followed by a free replacement computer and, eventually, a replacement computer bundled with additional memory, a disk drive, monitor, and peripheral cards. The trade-in program contributed to the small number of surviving Apple I computers.

Following the success of the Apple II, and of Apple broadly, the Apple I came to be recognized as a historically significant personal computer. According to the 1986 Apple IIe Owner's Guide, an Apple I was then worth "between $10,000 and $15,000" (Note: equivalent to between $25,000 and $37,000 in 2025) Two Apple I computers were each sold for $14,000 at Vintage Computer Festival auctions, in 2000 and 2002.

In November 2010, an Apple I with a cache of original documents and packaging sold for £133,250 ($170,000) (Note: equivalent to £192,000 ($245,000) in 2024) at Christie's auction house in London. The documents included the return label showing Steve Jobs's parents' address, a personally typed and signed letter from Jobs (answering technical questions about the computer), and the invoice (listing "Steven" as the salesman). The computer was brought to Polytechnic University of Turin for restoration.

In October 2014 the Henry Ford Museum purchased an Apple I at a Bonhams auction for $905,000. (Note: equivalent to $1.21 million in 2025) The sale included the keyboard, monitor, cassette decks and a manual. In 2017, an Apple I removed from Steve Jobs's office in 1985 by Apple quality control engineer Don Hutmacher was placed on display at Living Computers: Museum + Labs.

On May 30, 2015, an elderly woman reportedly dropped off boxes of electronics for disposal at an electronics recycling center in the Silicon Valley of Northern California. Included in the electronics (removed from her garage after the death of her husband) was an original Apple I computer, which the recycling firm sold for $200,000. When a discarded item is sold, it is the company's practice to give 50% of the proceeds to the original owner, but the woman has not been identified.

Apple I computers with original documents and memorabilia have frequently been auctioned for over $300,000 throughout the 2010s and 2020s. The production prototype for the Apple I survives in a badly damaged state and was itself auctioned in 2022 for $677,196. The validation prototype for the Apple I, which represented the final design of the PCB before mass production, survives fully intact and was sold at auction in 2026 for $2,750,000.

=== Replicas ===
Several Apple I clones and replicas have been released in recent years. These are created by hobbyists and marketed to the hobbyist/collector community. Availability is usually limited to small runs in response to demand.

=== Emulation ===
Emulation software for the Apple I has been written for modern home computers and for web browsers. It has also been emulated on 1980s era computers including the SAM Coupé and Commodore 64.

== See also ==
- Computer museum
- History of computer science
- History of computing
- KIM-1
