= Dynasty Computer =

Dynasty Computer Corporation
- Company type: Private
- Industry: Computer; Multi-level marketing
- Founded: April 1980; 45 years ago in Dallas, Texas, United States
- Founder: Larry Hagerty
- Defunct: November 1983; 41 years ago
- Fate: Dissolved

Dynasty Computer Corporation was a short-lived American multi-level marketing company active from 1980 to 1983 and based in Dallas, Texas. The company exclusively sold home computer systems through door-to-door demonstrations (a la Avon) and was the first company to sell computers via direct selling. Dynasty's line-up of computers comprised only two systems: the Smart-Alec II, a rebadged Exidy Sorcerer; and the Smart-Alec Jr., a rebadged VTech Laser 200. Dynasty went defunct in November 1983 amid mounting competition from IBM and their upcoming PCjr.

== History ==
Dynasty Computer Corporation was founded in April 1980 by Larry Hagerty in Dallas, Texas. Hagerty previously worked as an attorney in Texas before working for Ideal, Inc., a multi-level marketing (MLM) company also based in Dallas that did direct sales of cosmetics, for six years. The increasing popularity of home computer systems during the turn of the 1980s inspired Hagerty to found Dynasty to perform direct sales of computers to households. On its foundation in April 1980, Dynasty was the first MLM dedicated to computers. After recruiting several hundred resellers by 1981, Dynasty began operating in July 1981, with its resellers selling computer hardware and software door-to-door in the Dallas–Fort Worth area. The company made $1 million in sales in its first year.

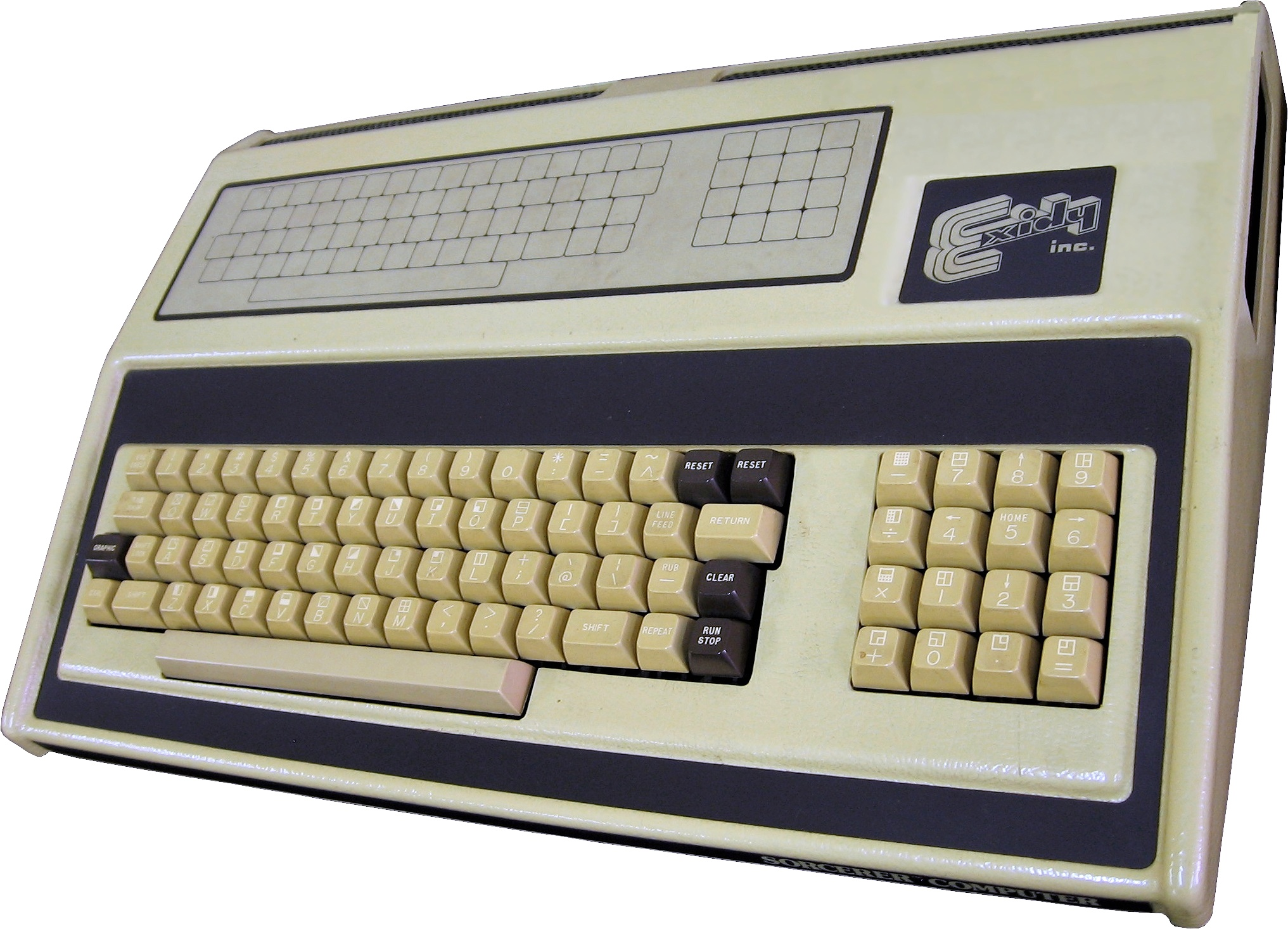
An Exidy Sorcerer, which Dynasty resold as the Smart-Alec II

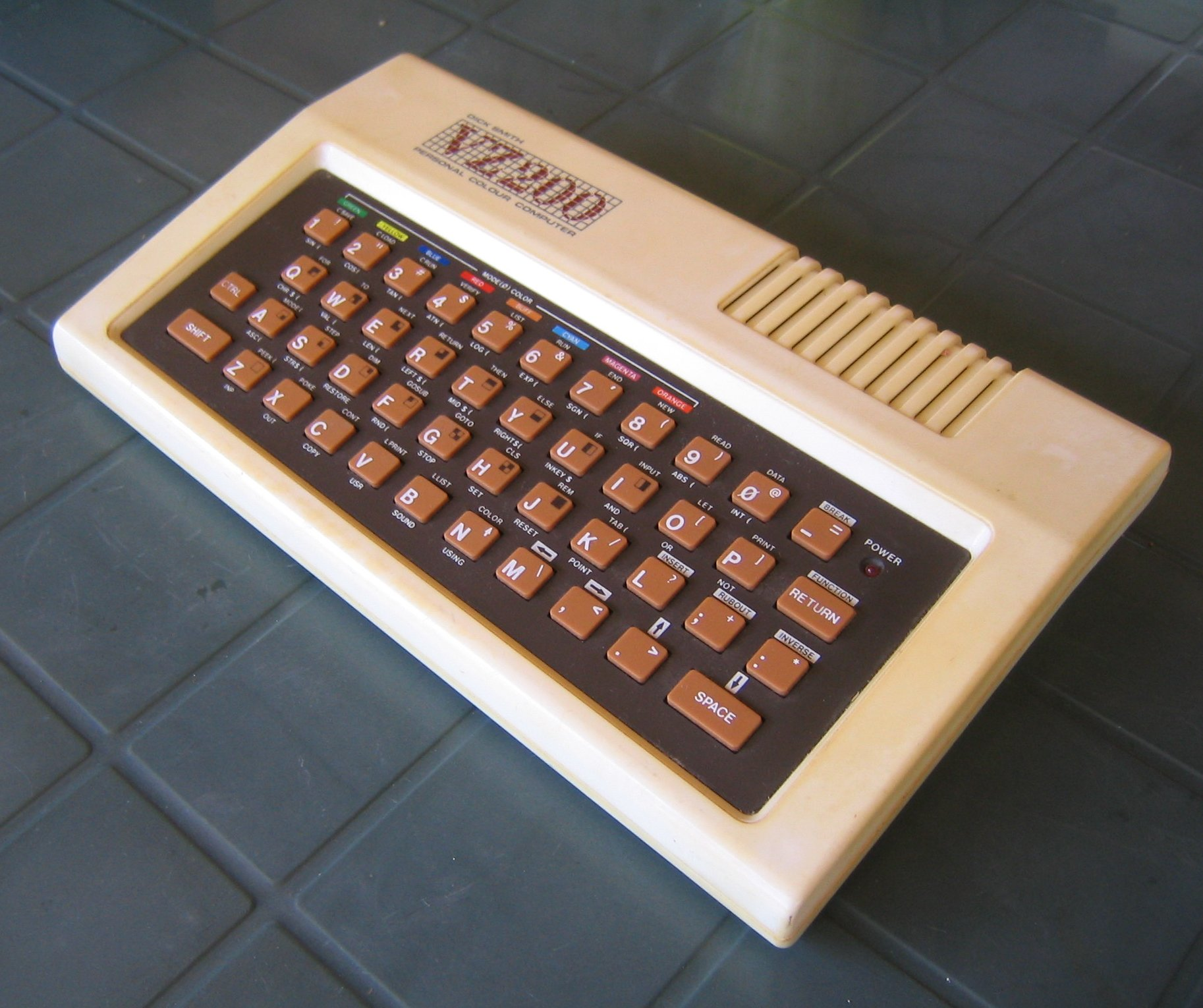
A Laser 200 (in this instance rebranded by Dick Smith as the VZ 200), which Dynasty resold as the Smart-Alec Jr

Dynasty's first complete computer system was the Smart-Alec II, a rebadged version of the Sorcerer, a CP/M-based home computer originally marketed by Exidy Systems. Exidy stopped marketing the Sorcerer in 1981 after selling the rights to the Biotech Corporation, a venture capital company based in Richardson, Texas. The computer's sub-assemblies continued to be manufactured in California, where Exidy was based, with final assembly performed in Dallas close to Biotech and Dynasty. After selling the rights to the Sorcerer to Dynasty, the latter extended its hardware to support 64 KB of RAM and an 80-column text mode.

By mid-1983, Dynasty had sold 3,000 units of the Smart-Alec II to its resellers, who operated in 28 states across the U.S. Its resellers sold the computer via door-to-door sales and party plans, a la Amway and Avon. Resellers who wanted to join Dynasty had to pay the company a $25 license fee. Hagerty described the average reseller as "a [45-year-old] man with two children and a $45,000 income". The company's MLM approach was met with skepticism from traditional computer marketers, who predicted an early collapse due to the lack of comparison shopping inherent in MLM and the resellers' inability to tailor the computer's hardware to the specific needs of individuals.

In early 1983, the company their second and final computer system, the Smart-Alec Jr., which was a rebadged version of the Laser 200 from VTech. Intended as a "starter" computer, it featured a Zilog Z80 microprocessor and an chiclet keyboard (as opposed to the mechanical keyboard of the Smart-Alec II, née Sorcerer). Resellers could have bought just the computer itself or a bundle with 25 pieces of software for the same price.

Amid mounting competition from IBM and their upcoming PCjr, Dynasty stopped accepting new resellers in November 1983 and collapsed shortly thereafter.
