= Trade credit =

Trade credit is the loan extended by one trader to another when the goods and services are bought on credit. Trade credit facilitates the purchase of supplies without immediate payment. Trade credit is commonly used by business organizations as a source of short-term financing. It is granted to those customers who have a reasonable amount of financial standing and goodwill. (Kuveya, 2020)

There are many forms of trade credit in common use. Various industries use various specialized forms. They all have, in common, the collaboration of businesses to make efficient use of capital to accomplish various business objectives.

Trade credit is the largest use of capital for a majority of business-to-business (B2B) sellers in the United States and is a critical source of capital for a majority of all businesses. For example, Wal-Mart, the largest retailer in the world, has used trade credit as a larger source of capital than bank borrowings; trade credit for Wal-Mart is 8 times the amount of capital invested by shareholders.

== Example ==
The operator of an ice cream stand may sign a franchising agreement, under which the distributor agrees to provide ice cream stock under the terms "net 60" with a ten percent discount on payment within 30 days, and a 20% discount on payment within 10 days. This means that the operator has 60 days to pay the invoice in full. If sales are good within the first week, the operator may be able to send a cheque for all or part of the invoice, and make an extra 20% on the ice cream sold. However, if sales are slow, leading to a month of low cash flow, then the operator may decide to pay within 30 days, obtaining a 10% discount, or use the money for another 30 days and pay the full invoice amount within 60 days.

If the ice cream distributor for its part were to receive trade credit from milk and sugar suppliers on terms of net 30 and 2% discount if paid within ten days, it would appear it were taking a loss or disadvantageous position in this web of trade credit balances. The ice cream distributor may be willing to do so if it has a substantial markup on the ingredients and other costs of production of the ice cream it sells to the operator, but there exists more than one reason to manage trade credit terms for the benefit of a business, and more than one way to do so. The ice cream distributor may be well-capitalized either from the owners' investment or from accumulated profits, and may be looking to expand his markets. They may be aggressive in attempting to locate new customers or to help them get established. It is not in their best interests for customers to go out of business from cash flow instabilities, so their financial terms aim to accomplish two things:

1. Allow startup ice cream parlors the ability to mismanage their investment in inventory for a while, while learning their markets, without having a dramatic negative balance in their bank account which could put them out of business. This is in effect, a short-term business loan made to help expand the distributor's market and customer base.
2. By tracking who pays, and when, the distributor can see potential problems developing and take steps to reduce or increase the allowed amount of trade credit he extends to prospering or exposure to losses from customers going bankrupt who would never pay for the ice cream delivered.

== Alternatives ==
One alternative to straightforward trade credit is when a supplier offers to give product on consignment to a trader e.g. a gift shop. The terms of the arrangement mean that the original supplier retains ownership of the goods until the shop sells them. Trade credit has been identified as a critical source of short-term financing for listed manufacturing companies. A trade credit contract is a legally binding agreement between two parties that allows a buyer to purchase goods or services on account and pay the supplier at a later date

== See also ==
- Discounts and allowances
- Trade credit insurance
