= MicroAge =

Technology services and solutions provider

Frontier Technology, LLC
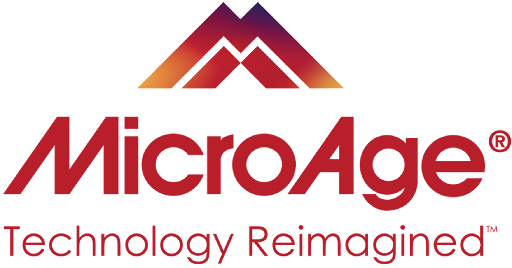
- Founded: 1976; 50 years ago Phoenix, Arizona, U.S.
- Founder: Jeffrey D. McKeever; Alan P. Hald
- Headquarters: Phoenix, Arizona, United States
- Key people: Rob Zack, CEO; Tracey Hayes, VP-Sales; Larry Fulop, VP-Technology & Marketing; Larry Gentry, EVP-Services; Tim McCulloch, CTO
- Products: Technology
- Website: microage.com

Frontier Technology, LLC, doing business as MicroAge, is a privately held American technology products and services company founded in 1976 and based in Phoenix, Arizona.

== History ==
In 1976, founders Jeffrey D. McKeever and Alan Hald opened up a franchise for one of the first hobby computer stores in the United States, The Byte Shop, in Tempe, Arizona. The company grew quickly and, in 1979, opened the first MicroAge Computer Store at Paradise Valley Mall in Phoenix, Arizona. The store sold computers popular in the early home computer age, such as the Apple II, NorthStar Horizon, IMSAI 8080 and Altair 8800.

As of 1983 MicroAge had 33 franchises, the second-most after ComputerLand, and was the third-largest computer store chain after ComputerLand and Sears. After emerging from bankruptcy with $5 million from Docutel/Olivetti, MicroAge developed into a major national distributor as well as having its own chain of stores, becoming the most widely known franchiser in the computer industry with over 1,400 franchises worldwide, including locations in Europe, Japan and the USSR. Its primary competitor at the time was ComputerLand, another well-known franchising operation. The company was listed on the Fortune 500 list from 1995 to 2001. It employed over 6,000 people and generated revenues in excess of $6 billion at its zenith.

By February 2000, the company was composed of four subsidiary parts: MicroAge Teleservices, MicroAge Technology Services, Pinacor, and Quality Integration Services. In November 2000, MicroAge Teleservices was sold to that subsidiary's largest customer, United Parcel Service. In December 2000, MicroAge Technology Services was sold to CompuCom, included MicroAge's network of service and support locations. In May 2001 some assets of Pinacor were sold to ScanSource.

On October 1, 2020, MicroAge announced that it had acquired Semaphore Co., an Atlanta-based cloud services organization.

On July 15, 2022, MicroAge announced that it had acquired cStor, a cybersecurity, infrastructure, and digital transformation organization based in Scottsdale, Arizona, for an undisclosed sum.
