= Byte Shop =

Defunct American computer retail chain

Byte, Inc.
- Trade name: Byte Shop
- Type: Private
- Industry: Retail; Computer
- Founded: December 8, 1975; 50 years ago in Mountain View, California, United States
- Founders: Paul Terrell; Boyd Wilson
- Defunct: December 1977; 48 years ago
- Fate: Acquired by Logical Machine Corporation
- Number of locations: 74

The Byte Shop was a chain of retail computer stores founded in Mountain View, California, by Paul Terrell and Boyd Wilson in 1975. It was among the first retail establishments in existence dedicated to computer products. It is perhaps best known for being the first to order Apple Computer's first ever product, the Apple I, in 1976. At its peak, the Byte Shop operated 73 stores in the United States and a single store in Japan. In November 1977, Terrell sold Byte Shop's parent company Byte, Inc., to Logical Machine Corporation, who continued to run the Byte Shop for several years.

== History ==
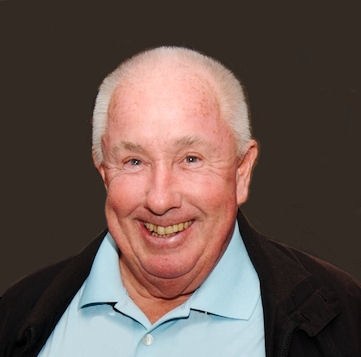
Byte Shop co-founder Paul Terrell, pictured c. 2016

=== Foundation (1975–1976) ===
Paul Terrell opened up the first Byte Shop at 1063 West El Camino Real in Mountain View, California, on December 8, 1975. The store was named directly after the influential microcomputer magazine Byte, founded three months prior to the Byte Shop. Terrell was joined in the foundation of the Byte Shop with his business partner Boyd Wilson. The store initially vended hardware, books, magazines, and software for microcomputers. Within its first month, the Byte Shop generated sales of US$7,000 (equivalent to $41,883 in 2025). Terrell and Wilson initially encountered resistance by some of the manufacturers he purchased from because of the low volume of purchase orders that the Byte Shop requested, and the pair decided to switch to volume buying in January 1976, at which point they floated the notion of franchising the Byte Shop.

By February 1976, sales had increased to US$40,000 (equivalent to $239,332 in 2025). On March 2, 1976, Terrell opened up the second Byte Shop at 3400 El Camino Real in Santa Clara, California. Following widespread interest among prospective franchisees, Terrell established a holding company, Byte, Inc., in March 1976, the same month they announced their third store in Campbell, California, planned for a May 1976 opening. In July 1976, the store was profiled in an issue of Business Week, recognizing it as a computer hobbyist success story and a significant opportunity for growth through capital investment. This exposure led to an avalanche of interest from venture capitalists and prospective franchisees, and soon the company was opening eight Byte Shops per month. By the end of 1976, several more stores had opened up in California, in cities such as Palo Alto, Santa Clara, and San Jose. The first Byte Shop located out of state was opened in Portland, Oregon, that year. Another Byte Shop in Minneapolis, Minnesota, soon followed in October 1976.

Before founding the Byte Shop, Terrell and Boyd both previously worked at Micro Instrumentation and Telemetry Systems (MITS), makers of the popular and influential Altair 8800 microcomputer, as MITS' Northern California sales representatives. In late 1975, Terrell had signed an exclusivity agreement with MITS to vend the Altair 8800 as the Byte Shop's one and only computer system available for sale. Much to the chagrin of MITS' founder Ed Roberts and the director of marketing David Bunnell, Terrell almost immediately violated this agreement, proceeding to stock computer systems from MITS' competitors IMS Associates, Inc. (IMSAI), and Processor Technology. In March 1976, Roberts approached Terrell at the first annual World Altair Computer Convention in Albuquerque, New Mexico, informing him that his dealer relationship with the Byte Shop had been terminated and that MITS would no longer supply Altairs to Byte Shops. Terrell initially shrugged off the loss of their business relationship with MITS, as IMSAI computers had outsold Altair 8800s at the Byte Shops two-to-one. However, it soon became clear that they needed another company's hardware to stay ahead in the increasingly competitive microcomputer market.

=== Early investment in Apple Computer (1976–1977) ===
After founding Apple Computer, Inc., in April 1976, Steve Jobs and Steve Wozniak gave a presentation of their fully assembled single-board computer, the "Apple Computer A", at the Homebrew Computer Club. Terrell, who was in attendance, saw the presentation and was impressed by the machine. Terrell told Jobs that he would order 50 units of the computer and pay $500 each (equivalent to $2,829 in 2025) on delivery, but only if they came fully assembled—he was not interested in buying bare printed circuit boards with no components.

Jobs took the purchase order from the Byte Shop to national electronic parts distributor Cramer Electronics and ordered the components needed. When asked by the credit manager how he would pay for the parts, Jobs replied, "I have this purchase order from the Byte Shop chain of computer stores for 50 of my computers and the payment terms are COD. If you give me the parts on net 30-day terms I can build and deliver the computers in that time frame, collect my money from Terrell at the Byte Shop and pay you."

To verify the purchase order, the credit manager called Terrell, who assured him if the computers showed up, Jobs would have more than enough money for the parts order. The two Steves and their small crew spent day and night building and testing the computers, now renamed the Apple I, and delivered to Terrell on time. Terrell was surprised to receive a batch of assembled circuit boards, as he had expected complete computers with a case, monitor and keyboard. Nonetheless, he kept his word and paid the two Steves the money promised. Through this relationship, Terrell became first person to order Apple's first ever product, the Apple I, and became one of the first to vend the computer to the public through the Byte Shop. Terrell's US$25,000 purchase order gave Apple a significant boost in credibility in the computer industry and was a major factor in their early growth.

=== Sale and aftermath (1977) ===
In early 1977, the Byte Shop introduced their own private-label microcomputer system, called the BYT-8. It featured an Intel 8080 microprocessor and was based on an S-100 bus design. It was a modest commercial success, netting a roughly 50-percent profit margin for the Byte Shop—more than double the margin of the contemporaneous third-party computer systems they had been selling.

Between September 1977 and November 1977, Byte Shop went from having 67 locations to a peak of 74. By this point, Byte, Inc., had opened up their first cross-border shop Byte Shop in Canada and their first overseas Byte Shop in Tokyo, Japan. (Note: The first international Byte Shop franchise was opened in Vancouver, British Columbia, Canada, in 1976.) (Note: As part of its international expansion, Byte Shop opened a location on the 7th floor of the Radio Kaikan building in Akihabara, Tokyo, Japan.)

In November 1977, Logical Machine Corporation, a computer manufacturer based in Sunnyvale, California, announced that they signed an agreement with Terrell and Boyd to acquire Byte, Inc. (and the Byte Shops by proxy) for an unspecified amount. The acquisition of Byte, Inc. was finalized in December 1977, the acquisition cost later revealed to be US$4 million (equivalent to $21,252,059 in 2025).

Many of the original Byte Shop dealers eventually became independent as the personal computer marketplace grew and became segmented by the various uses and applications the PC was developing. Hobby computer stores were becoming business centers, and IBM was entering the market with a computer of its own which over time would become the standard in the industry. Byte Shops of Arizona became MicroAge Computers and developed into a major national distributor as well as having its own chain of stores. Byte Shop Northwest dominated its geographical area and was acquired by Pacific Bell in 1985 when they elected to get into computer stores. Its founders, Pat and Rick Terrell, went on to found Leading Technology, a maker of IBM PC–compatible monitors and computer systems, in 1985. Paul Terrell himself later founded a chain of retail software stores in Northern California called the Software Emporium.

=== Sold again (1986) ===
In 1986, Logical Machine Corporation sold the rights to the franchises to Sir Peter Rigby, who established many more franchises later on in the United Kingdom. He then hired the world-famous British designer Sir Terrance Conran to redesign the Byte logo and design the stores. In 1993, he launched the retail chain Byte Computer Superstore, operating the store until Dixons purchased the company in 1998.

=== Purchased by Khalid Hassan (2012) ===
In 2012, Khalid Hassan purchased Byte, bringing the franchise to more locations. Byte now is a tech repair, computer parts and gadget store.

=== Products ===
These products were sold at Byte since the 1970s:

=== S-100 Bus Computers and Related Boards ===
- IMSAI 8080
- Altair 8800 (MITS) (Note: Byte Shop eventually dropped the Altair from its product line.)
- Cromemco
- Polymorphic 88 (PolyMorphic Systems)
- Processor Technology SOL-20 (Note: The manufacturer was listed in a July 1976 Byte Shop ad. The sale of the VDM-1 board confirms its presence in the store's inventory.)
- BYT-8 (Byte Inc.) : The company's own branded S-100 kit computer.
- S-100 bus Cards
  - 4K RAM Card
  - 16K RAM Card
  - 3P+S I/O Card
  - VDM-1 (Processor Technology) (Note: The manufacturer was listed in a July 1976 Byte Shop ad, and the VDM-1 was an essential S-100 video board.)
  - Cassette Interface (S-100) (Note: S-100 computers required a dedicated board for cassette data I/O.)

=== Other Computers and Peripherals ===
- SWTPC 6800 (SWTPC)
- Apple I (as an "assembled board") (Note: Confirmed via Byte Shop's own advertisements listing the product and price.)
  - Apple I Case (Referred to by collectors as the "Byte Shop Case"): Paul Terrell commissioned a local cabinetmaker to produce a case, often identified as Kona Wood, as Steve Jobs originally delivered the Apple I as a bare board.
  - Apple I Power Transformer (Note: Listed as "Power transformer" in Byte Shop advertisements.)
  - Apple I Keyboard (Primarily Datanetics): Byte Shop provided a keyboard, typically Datanetics, as an essential peripheral.
  - Apple I Cassette Interface (Note: Listed as "Cassette Interface" in Byte Shop advertisements.)
