= Tulip Computers =

1979–2009 Dutch computer manufacturer

- Logo as of 2002
- Formerly: Compudata (1979–1987); Tulip Computers NV (1987–2008); Nedfield NV (2008-2009)
- Type: Public company
- Traded as: ENX: NEDFIELD
- ISIN: NL0006327322
- Industry: Computers
- Founded: 1979
- Defunct: 3 September 2009
- Fate: Bankruptcy and liquidation
- Headquarters: Amersfoort, Netherlands
- Key people: Mark Elbertse, CEO; Franz Hetzenauer, Founder; Rob Romein, Founder
- Products: Computers, ICT
- Revenue: ▲€ 215 million (2006)
- Operating income: ▲€ 8.6 million (2006)
- Net income: ▲€ 6.7 million (2006)
- Website: tulip.com at the Wayback Machine (archived 2001-02-02)

Tulip Computers NV was a Dutch computer manufacturer that manufactured PC clones.

== History ==
It was founded in 1979 as Compudata, as an importer of American microcomputers. Compudata was the distributor for Europe for the Exidy Sorcerer, a Zilog Z80-based home computer. When Exidy gave up on the Sorcerer in 1979, Compudata licensed the design and manufactured them locally for several years.

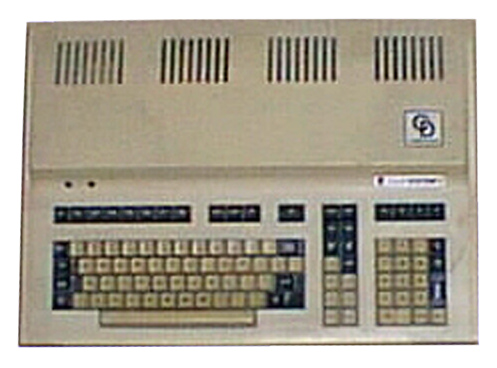
Tulip System 1, c. 1983

In 1983 it launched its own PC, the Tulip PC. The initial model (as shown without the tower, which housed drives and a monitor) ran a generic MS-DOS and was not BIOS-compatible with the IBM PC (5150); however, later models, to achieve 100% compatibility, simply copied the IBM PC, including the BIOS. IBM sued, and after years of litigation, Tulip and IBM settled out of court for an undisclosed amount in 1989. It was listed on the Amsterdam Stock Exchange in 1984. In 1987, Compudata changed its name to Tulip Computers.

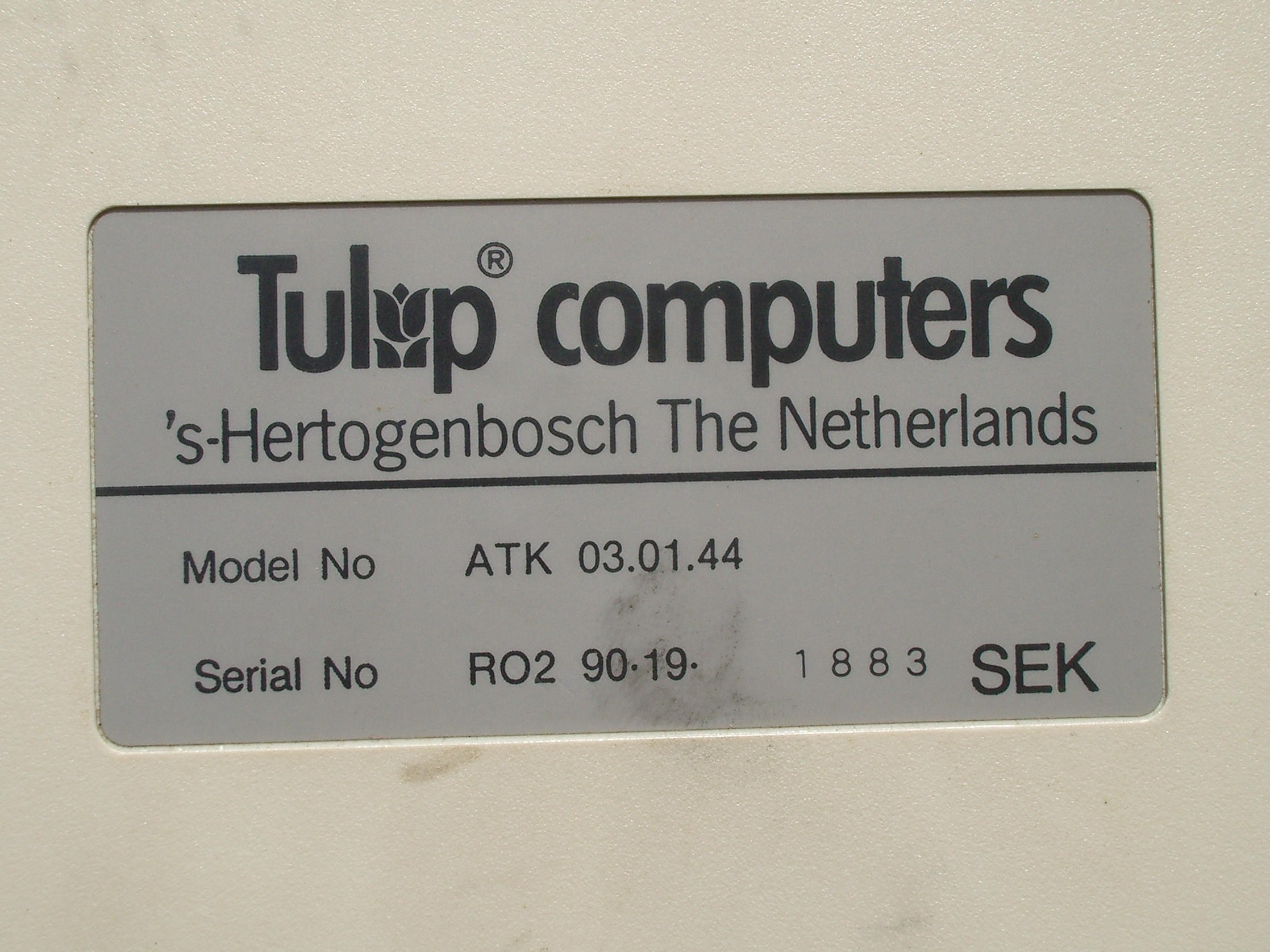
Tulip label from the back of a keyboard

Tulip made headlines among Commodore computer enthusiasts when it acquired the Commodore brand name in September 1997, and made headlines again in 2003 and 2004, when it tried to grab a share of the games and entertainment markets with Commodore-branded products. In 2000, the Government of Bangladesh cancelled a contract, funded by the Dutch government, with Tulip Computers to supply computers. The Bangladesh government reported the price for the computers was too high. Tulip Computers sued the Government of Bangladesh in a court in The Hague and secured a verdict that awarded Tulip computer compensation.

After supposedly making some headway in the market, it sold the Commodore name to Yeahronimo Media Ventures for €22 million. Negotiations began in the end of 2004; the transaction was completed in March 2005. On 27 September 2007, Tulip announced it wanted to buy back the Commodore brand for one dollar per share. Tulip thought it could make more profit by buying it again, due to the new activities of Commodore on other markets.

On 26 June 2008, Tulip changed its name to Nedfield NV. Nedfield faced serious problems due to the recession, and filed for suspension of payment after several of its subsidiaries went bankrupt. Nedfield NV itself was pronounced bankrupt by the district court of Utrecht on 3 September 2009 and was liquidated.

== Sponsorships ==
Tulip sponsored Crystal Palace Football Club between 1991 and 1993 and eponymous professional cycling teams based in Spain (1989–1990) and Belgium (1990–1992), Tulip Computers.

== See also ==
- Tulip System-1, one of the first 16-bit PCs
