= Logical Machine Corporation =

American computer company

Logical Business Machines, Inc.
- Formerly: John Peers and Company; Logical Machine Corporation
- Type: Private
- Industry: Computer
- Founded: September 1974; 51 years ago in Burlingame, California, United States
- Founder: John Peers
- Fate: Dissolution
- Headquarters: Sunnyvale, California (since 1976)
- Products: Minicomputers; Software
- Divisions: Byte, Inc.

Logical Machine Corporation (LOMAC) was an American computer company active from the mid-1970s to the 1980s and based in the San Francisco Bay Area. It was founded as John Peers and Company by the British entrepreneur John Peers in 1974. LOMAC developed the ADAM, a minicomputer which ran a specialized compiler for the company's natural English programming language.

Throughout the late 1970s, the company acquired several technology firms, including Byte, Inc., the owner of the Byte Shop retail chain. Despite its unique approach to computing and earning $5 million in revenue in 1977, LOMAC struggled as the industry began to standardize around the IBM Personal Computer (IBM PC). Following Peers's departure in 1980, the company rebranded as Logical Business Machines, Inc. (LBM, or simply Logical), and attempted to pivot toward IBM PC–compatible hardware. However, financial difficulties led to the company filing for Chapter 11 bankruptcy in 1984. After emerging from bankruptcy in 1985 with new investment, Logical ceased hardware manufacturing to focus exclusively on software development and value-added reselling.

== History ==
John Peers (born 1942) founded Logical Machine Corporation as John Peers and Company in September 1974. The company originally occupied a 4,500-square-foot office in Burlingame, California. The company was Peers' fourth; he had recently sold off Allied Business Systems of London to Trafalgar House in 1974. Peers sought to set up manufacturing in an agricultural zone in Ukiah, California. Following a delay, caused in part by concerned residents, a 30,000-square-foot plant was raised in Burke Hill, three miles south of Ukiah.

The Ukiah plant was built to mass manufacture the company's ADAM minicomputer. The ADAM computer ran a specialized compiler for the company's natural English programming language; that is to say, the programming language attempted to closely emulate English syntax. Prototypes of the ADAM were built in May 1974, based on specifications devised in October 1973. Peers had yet to patent the technology as of June 1975. The ADAM's central processing unit was bolted onto an 7-by-6-foot L-shaped desk, on which rested its terminal. Twenty units of the ADAM were installed between April 1975 and February 1976, out of a backlog of orders for 3,500 from 500 clients, manufactured out of the company's Burlingame headquarters. It cost US$40,000. A controversial print advertisement featuring a naked woman seated at an ADAM terminal—as a pastiche of Adam and Eve—was recalled in early 1976 as a result of outcry from the National Organization for Women.

The company changed its name to Logical Machine Corporation (LOMAC) in October 1976 and moved its headquarters to a 26,000-square-foot building in Sunnyvale, California, in anticipation of a ramping up of orders for the ADAM. The company originally occupied half of the building; they later purchased the other half from the tenant in July 1977 to double its manufacturing output. For fiscal year 1977, the company earned $5 million in revenue. In December 1977, LOMAC acquired Byte, Inc.—the proprietor of The Byte Shop, the first computer retail chain—from Paul Terrell and Boyd Wilson for an unspecified amount. The Byte Shop had 65 locations in the San Francisco Bay Area in 1978; it catered mainly to hobbyists with low cost microcomputer kits, in contrast to the high cost of LOMAC's ADAM. By July 1978, however, LOMAC were able to reduce the price of the ADAM down to $15,000. The company by that point had shipped their 50th ADAM and expanded to 14 countries.

Also in 1978, LOMAC acquired Mass Memory—a high-tech optical storage company based in Phoenix, Arizona, whose products had storage capacities on the order gigabytes and terabytes—and Centigram, makers of the Mike—a computer with speech recognition. Later that year, the company introduced Tina, a low-cost version of the ADAM. LOMAC suffered losses that year and appointed Jerry Brandt to the board of directions, naming him chief operating officer, in August 1978. Brandt had Logical absorb Mass Memory and Centigram into the parent operations, shutting down their respective plants in the process, converted 10 Byte Shops to franchises and opened 25 more franchised Byte locations, and stopped direct sales of LOMAC's business computer products. By the beginning of 1979, LOMAC was profitable once more, and Brandt was let go from LOMAC.

Peers left LOMAC in 1980, following a slump in the company's sales. He became an executive director of the United States Robotics Society, a consortium for industrial automation companies, that year. Following Peers' departure, LOMAC changed its name to Logical Business Machines, adopting the name of its European subsidiary. In 1983, the company announced a 16-bit clone of the IBM PC, called the Logical L-XT, which featured a 10-MB hard drive, 320-KB floppy drive and 192 KB of RAM, and a real-time clock, and came shipped with various software (including MS-DOS, a word processor, and a spreadsheet application) and an amber CRT monitor. The following year, the company introduced L-NET, a local area network system based on the L-XT that could link up to 64 computers. L-NET came shipped with a natural programming language, Diplomat—a descendant of the programming language used on the ADAM.

In June 1983, Logical sued Coleco Industries over trademark infringement with the latter's to-be-released Adam microcomputer. Logical cited confusion from their existing ADAM customer base caused by the announcement of the Coleco Adam as the basis for the suit. Coleco challenged Logical in the press, writing that Logical's rights to the Adam trademark for use in computers had lapsed earlier in the year. The two settled out of court, with Coleco agreeing to license the Adam name from Logical in exchange for unlimited rights to the Adam trademark.

Logical halted development of the L-XT when they filed for Chapter 11 bankruptcy in July 1984. The company had been $4 million in debt. They emerged from bankruptcy in September 1985, after being infused with $2 million from Carat Ltd. The latter immediately received a little less than 50 percent ownership in Logical—this stake set to grow to over 50 percent over the next six months. As part of the terms of exiting bankruptcy, Logical stopped manufacturing hardware and strictly became a software development company and value-added reseller of computer systems.
