= Net D =

Payment term

Net 10, net 15, net 30 and net 60 (often hyphenated "net-" and/or followed by "days", e.g., "net 10 days") are payment terms for trade credit, which specify that the net amount (the total outstanding on the invoice) is expected to be paid in full by the buyer within 10, 15, 30 or 60 days of the date when the goods are dispatched or the service is completed. Net 30 or net 60 terms are often coupled with a credit for early payment.

The word net in this sense means "total after all discounts". It originally derives from the Latin nitere (to shine) and nitidus (elegant, trim), and more recently from the French net (sharp, neat, clean).

== Examples ==
- The notation "net 30" indicates that full payment is expected within 30 days. If a $1000 invoice has the terms "net 30", the buyer must pay the full $1000 within 30 days.
- The notation "2% 10, net 30" indicates that a 2% discount can be taken by the buyer only if payment is received in full within 10 days of the date of the invoice, and that full payment is expected within 30 days, For example, if a $1000 invoice has the terms, "2% 10, net 30", the buyer can take a 2% discount ($1000 × .02 = $20) and make a payment of $980 within 10 days or pay the full $1000 within 30 days.

== Usage ==
Net 30 is a term that most business and municipalities (federal, state, and local) use in the United States. Net 10 and net 15 are widely used as well, especially for contractors and service-oriented businesses (as opposed to those that deal with tangible goods). Net 60 is not used as frequently due to its longer payment term.

Legally speaking, net 30 means that buyer will pay seller in full on or before the 30th calendar day (including weekends and holidays) of when the goods were dispatched by the seller or the services were fully provided. Transit time is included when counting the days, i.e. a purchase in transit for 7 days before receipt has just 23 additional days until payment is due to the seller. Net 30 payment terms typically have an interest penalty for not meeting these terms and they begin accruing on the 31st day after dispatch. The same happens with net 60, but 60 days are given for payment, interest penalties begin on the 61st day and thus a purchase in transit for 7 days has now 53 days until payment is due to the seller.

In certain markets such as the United Kingdom, a construction such as "net 30, end of the month" or "Net Monthly Account" indicates that payment in full is expected by the end of the month following the month of the invoice.

== See also ==
- Discounts and allowances
- Net (economics)
- Accounts payable and Accounts receivable
