= List of Computer Chronicles episodes =

Episodes of American television series

Logo as The Computer Chronicles from 1983 to 1989

Computer Chronicles is an American half-hour television series, which was broadcast from 1983 to 2002 on Public Broadcasting Service (PBS) public television. Presented by Gary Kildall, Stewart Cheifet, and George Morrow, the series documented various issues from the rise of the personal computer from its infancy to the global market at the turn of the 21st century.

Computer Chronicles was created in 1983 by Stewart Cheifet (later the show's co-host), who was then the station manager of the College of San Mateo's KCSM-TV. The series was initially broadcast as a local weekly series, co-produced by WITF-TV in Harrisburg, Pennsylvania. It became a national series on PBS from 1983 to 2002, with Cheifet co-hosting most of the later seasons. Kildall served as co-host from 1983 to 1990, providing insights and commentary on products, as well as discussions on the future of the ever-expanding personal computer sphere.

A total of 488 episodes of Computer Chronicles were produced from 1983 to 2002. New episodes broadcast on Sundays with a duration of 30 minutes, four episodes a month, 48 episodes per year. All episodes were digitized and provided to the Internet Archive for free streaming and download.

== Episodes ==
=== Overview ===
Season	Episodes	Originally released	
Season	Episodes	First released	Last released
1	26	February 5, 1984	November 2, 1984
2	16	January 15, 1985	June 18, 1985
3	26	September 3, 1985	March 25, 1986
4	34	September 16, 1986	May 12, 1987
5	26	October 28, 1987	June 1988
6	23	October 11, 1988	May 23, 1989
7	26	November 2, 1989	May 24, 1990
8	26	October 2, 1990	May 21, 1991
9	27	October 1, 1991	June 2, 1992
10	27	October 6, 1992	June 1, 1993
11	27	September 28, 1993	June 14, 1994
12	26	October 4, 1994	August 1, 1995
13	25	September 26, 1995	June 18, 1996
14	25	September 24, 1996	June 24, 1997
15	27	October 7, 1997	July 14, 1998
16	24	October 6, 1998	April 27, 1999
17	24	October 12, 1999	August 1, 2000
18	21	November 21, 2000	June 12, 2001
19	21	September 18, 2001	June 25, 2002

=== Season 1 (1984) ===
No. in season	Title	Original release date	Internet Archive identifier
1	"Mainframes to Minis to Micros"	February 5, 1984	Stream
The evolution of computers—from mainframes, to minis, to micros—is explored with a visit to The Computer Museum in Boston. The HP-150, released in 1983, is demonstrated.; Interviewed: Gordon Bell (Digital Equipment Corporation), Herb Lechner (SRI International), Cyril Yansouni (Hewlett-Packard).
2	"Integrated Software"	February 12, 1984	Stream
The Apple Lisa and VisiCorp's Visi On are demonstrated.; Interviewed: John Couch (Apple Computer), Bill Coleman (VisiCorp).
3	"Computer Music"	February 19, 1984	Stream
Music Construction Set and the alphaSyntauri music synthesizer system for the Apple II are demonstrated. Various music-related research projects from Stanford and MIT are also demonstrated.; Interviewed: John Chowning (Stanford University), Will Harvey (Music Construction Set), Ellen Lapham (Syntauri).
4	"Computer Simulations"	February 26, 1984	Stream
Microsoft Flight Simulator 1.0 is demonstrated and footage from a professional computer flight simulator is shown. DRAFT Architecture Simulator is also demonstrated.; Interviewed: Frank Lewandowski (Singer-Link), Steve Harrison (Skidmore, Owings & Merrill)
5	"Operating Systems"	March 4, 1984	Stream
The CP/M operating system is demonstrated and compared and contrasted with UNIX System V.; Interviewed: Gary Kildall (Digital Research), Tony Fanning (Hewlett-Packard), Jean Yates (Yates Ventures)
6	"Word Processing"	March 5, 1984	Stream
Various different word processing applications are demonstrated, including WordVision for the IBM PC, The Word Plus for the Kaypro, and Writer's Workbench for UNIX System V.; Interviewed: Jim Edlin (WordVision), Paul Schindler (Information Systems News), Warren Kuhl (AT&T), Wayne Holder (Oasis Systems)
7	"Computer Security"	March 12, 1984	Stream
8	"Robotics"	March 19, 1984	Stream
9	"Speech Synthesis"	March 26, 1984	Stream
10	"Local Area Networks"	April 2, 1984	Stream
11	"Microchip Technology"	April 5, 1984	Stream
12	"Business Applications"	April 9, 1984	Stream
13	"Storage Devices"	April 16, 1984	Stream
14	"Printers"	April 23, 1984	Stream
15	"Database Software"	April 30, 1984	Stream
16	"Computer Graphics (1984)"	May 7, 1984	Stream
17	"Decision Support Systems"	May 14, 1984	Stream
18	"Computer Ergonomics (1984)"	May 21, 1984	Stream
19	"Programming Languages (1984)"	June 25, 1984	Stream
20	"Software Utilities"	July 2, 1984	Stream
21	"Computer Games (1984)"	September 28, 1984	Stream
22	"Computer Entrepreneurs"	October 5, 1984	Stream (alternative link)
23	"Fifth Generation Computers"	October 12, 1984	Stream
24	"Super Computers"	October 19, 1984	Stream
25	"Artificial Intelligence (1984)"	October 26, 1984	Stream (alternative link)
26	"Computers in Education"	November 2, 1984	Stream

=== Season 2 (1985) ===
No. in season	Title	Original release date	Internet Archive identifier
1	"Laser Disk Storage"	January 15, 1985	Stream
2	"Portable Computers"	January 22, 1985	Stream (alternative link)
3	"Computer Games (1985)"	January 29, 1985	Stream
4	"IBM Compatibles"	February 5, 1985	Stream
5	"Software Piracy"	February 12, 1985	Stream
6	"Computers and the Disabled (1985)"	February 19, 1985	Stream
7	"UNIX (1985)"	February 26, 1985	Stream
8	"Computers and Sports (1985)"	March 5, 1985	Stream
9	"Personal Finance Software (1985)"	March 12, 1985	Stream
10	"The Macintosh Computer"	March 19, 1985	Stream
11	"IBM"	March 26, 1985	Stream
12	"Computers and Communications"	April 16, 1985	Stream
13	"Low End Computers"	April 30, 1985	Stream
14	"Japanese PCs"	May 21, 1985	Stream
15	"Japanese Computer Technology"	May 28, 1985	Stream
16	"Computer Graphics (1985)"	June 18, 1985	Stream

=== Season 3 (1985-86) ===
No. in season	Title	Original release date	Internet Archive identifier
1	"Slowdown in Silicon Valley: Part 1"	September 3, 1985	Stream
2	"Slowdown in Silicon Valley: Part 2"	September 10, 1985	Stream
3	"Women in Computing"	September 17, 1985	Stream
4	"Printers & Business Graphics"	September 24, 1985	Stream
5	"Computers and the Law"	October 1, 1985	N/A
6	"Programming & Programmers"	October 8, 1985	N/A
7	"Computers in the Media"	October 15, 1985	Stream
8	"Modems & Bulletin Boards"	October 22, 1985	Stream
9	"Computer Networks"	October 29, 1985	Stream
10	"Computers and Politics (1985)"	November 5, 1985	Stream
11	"Computers and Medicine"	November 12, 1985	Stream
12	"Optical Storage Devices"	November 19, 1985	Stream
13	"Business Applications (1985)"	November 26, 1985	Stream
14	"Amiga and Atari"	December 3, 1985	Stream
15	"Christmas Buyers Guide (1985)"	December 10, 1985	Stream
16	"Hard Disk Storage"	December 17, 1985	Stream
17	"Artificial Intelligence (1986)"	January 7, 1986	Stream
18	"Computers in Law Enforcement"	January 14, 1986	Stream
19	"Investment Software"	February 4, 1986	Stream
20	"Psychological Software"	February 11, 1986	Stream
21	"Astronomy Software"	February 18, 1986	Stream
22	"Color and Computing"	February 25, 1986	N/A
23	"Careers in Computing"	March 4, 1986	Stream
24	"Parallel Processing"	March 11, 1986	Stream
25	"Computers and the Pentagon: Part 1"	March 18, 1986	Stream
26	"Computers and the Pentagon: Part 2"	March 25, 1986	Stream

=== Season 4 (1986–87) ===
No. in season	Title	Original release date	Internet Archive identifier
1	"Educational Software: Part 1"	September 16, 1986	Stream
2	"Educational Software: Part 2"	September 23, 1986	Stream
3	"MIDI Music"	September 30, 1986	Stream
4	"RISC" "RISC Processors"	October 7, 1986	Stream
5	"Utilities"	October 14, 1986	Stream
6	"Second Hand Computers"	October 21, 1986	Stream
7	"Desktop Publishing: Part 1"	October 28, 1986	Stream
8	"Desktop Publishing: Part 2"	November 4, 1986	Stream
9	"Guide to Macros" "Software Macros"	November 11, 1986	Stream
10	"RAM Resident Software"	November 18, 1986	Stream
11	"Comdex Special (1986)"	November 25, 1986	Stream
12	"Project Management Software"	December 2, 1986	Stream
13	"Christmas Buyers Guide (1986)"	December 9, 1986	Stream
14	"Electronic Mail" "E-Mail Applications"	December 16, 1986	Stream
15	"386: The Fast Lane" "Intel 386 Microprocessor"	December 23, 1986	Stream
16	"On-Line Services: Part 1"	December 30, 1986	Stream
17	"On-Line Services: Part 2"	January 6, 1987	Stream
18	"Intelligent Buildings"	January 20, 1987	Stream
19	"Modems"	January 27, 1987	N/A
20	"Speech Recognition & Synthesis"	February 3, 1987	Stream
21	"Tax Preparation Software (1987)"	February 19, 1987	Stream
22	"Portable Computers"	February 17, 1987	Stream
23	"Computers and Kids (1987)" "Computer Kids"	February 24, 1987	Stream
24	"Computers and the Arts"	March 3, 1987	Stream
25	"Computers and Illiteracy"	March 10, 1987	Stream
26	"Computers and Gambling"	March 17, 1987	Stream
27	"Business Applications: Part 1 – Word Processors"	March 24, 1987	Stream
28	"Business Applications: Part 2 – Spreadsheets 1"	March 31, 1987	Stream
29	"Business Applications: Part 3 – Spreadsheets 2"	April 7, 1987	Stream
30	"Business Applications: Part 4 – Database Management Software"	April 14, 1987	Stream
31	"The New Macs"	April 21, 1987	Stream
32	"IBM PS/2"	April 28, 1987	Stream
33	"Super Computers (1987)"	May 5, 1987	Stream
34	"PC Clones from Asia"	May 12, 1987	Stream

=== Season 5 (1987–88) ===
No. in season	Title	Original release date	Internet Archive identifier
1	"HyperCard"	October 28, 1987	Stream
2	"Laser Printers"	November 4, 1987	Stream
3	"Comdex Special (1987)"	November 11, 1987	Stream
4	"Local Area Networks: Part 1 – IBM Compatibles"	November 18, 1987	Stream
5	"Local Area Networks: Part 2 – Apple"	November 25, 1987	Stream
6	"Consumer Buying Guide (1987)"	December 2, 1987	Stream
7	"Mac Business Software"	December 9, 1987	Stream
8	"Computer Games: Part 1"	December 16, 1987	Stream
9	"Computer Games: Part 2"	December 23, 1987	Stream
10	"Decision Support Software"	December 30, 1987	Stream
11	"PC Imaging"	January 6, 1988	Stream
12	"MacWorld San Francisco (1988)"	January 28, 1988	Stream
13	"The New Amigas"	1988	Stream
14	"CD-ROMs"	February 24, 1988	Stream
15	"Tax Preparation Software (1988)"	March 2, 1988	Stream
16	"Shareware"	1988	Stream
17	"The Commodore 64"	1988	Stream
18	"Multitasking Operating Systems"	1988	Stream
19	"Business Graphics: Part 1 – Mac"	1988	Stream
20	"Business Graphics: Part 2 – PC"	1988	Stream
21	"Input Devices"	1988	Stream
22	"Computers and Politics (1988)"	1988	N/A
23	"Laptop Peripherals"	1988	Stream
24	"Add-On Boards & Cards"	May 4, 1988	Stream
25	"Investment Software"	June 1, 1988	Stream
26	"Personal CAD Software"	June 1988	Stream

=== Season 6 (1988–89) ===
No. in season	Title	Original release date	Internet Archive identifier
1	"MacWorld Boston (1988)"	October 11, 1988	Stream
2	"Computer Bowl I: Part 1"	November 1, 1988	Stream
3	"Computer Bowl I: Part 2"	November 8, 1988	Stream
4	"Bus Wars"	November 15, 1988	Stream
5	"The Apple II"	November 22, 1988	Stream
6	"Spreadsheet Wars"	November 29, 1988	Stream
7	"Consumer Buyers Guide"	December 6, 1988	Stream
8	"Comdex Special (1988)"	December 13, 1988	Stream
9	"Hard Disk Management"	December 20, 1988	Stream
10	"Computer Viruses"	January 17, 1988	Stream
11	"Personal Information Management Software (PIMS)"	January 24, 1989	Stream
12	"MacWorld San Francisco (1989)"	February 28, 1989	Stream
13	"Amiga 2500"	March 7, 1989	Stream
14	"Fax Boards"	March 14, 1989	Stream
15	"Writing Style Software"	March 28, 1989	Stream
16	"Foreign Language Software (1989)"	April 4, 1989	Stream
17	"High Tech India: Part 1"	April 11, 1989	Stream
18	"UNIX (1989)"	April 18, 1989	Stream
19	"Atari ST"	April 25, 1989	Stream
20	"High Tech India: Part 2"	May 2, 1989	Stream
21	"Computing in Color"	May 9, 1989	N/A
22	"New Generation Laptops"	May 16, 1989	Stream
23	"Computers in Space"	May 23, 1989	Stream (alternative link)

=== Season 7 (1989–90) ===
No. in season	Title	Original release date	Internet Archive identifier
1	"Personal Finance Software (1989)"	November 2, 1989	N/A
2	"Creativity Software"	November 9, 1989	N/A
3	"Artificial Intelligence (1989)"	November 16, 1989	N/A
4	"New Portable Computers"	November 23, 1989	Stream
5	"Software for Kids (1989)"	November 30, 1989	N/A
6	"Megahertz Mania"	December 7, 1989	Stream
7	"Desktop Presentation Graphics: Part 1"	December 14, 1989	Stream
8	"Desktop Presentation Graphics: Part 2"	December 21, 1989	Stream
9	"Holiday Buyers Guide"	December 28, 1989	Stream
10	"Software Piracy"	January 4, 1990	Stream
11	"DOS to Mac and Back"	January 11, 1990	Stream
12	"Computers and Fitness"	January 18, 1990	Stream
13	"Low Cost LANs"	January 25, 1990	Stream
14	"Computers and the Law"	February 1, 1990	N/A
15	"Optical Storage"	February 8, 1990	Stream
16	"Low Cost Laser Printers"	February 15, 1990	Stream
17	"Computer Ergonomics (1990)"	February 22, 1990	N/A
18	"Programming Languages (1990)"	March 1, 1990	Stream
19	"HyperCard Update"	March 8, 1990	Stream
20	"Desktop Video"	March 15, 1990	Stream
21	"Flight Simulators (1990)"	March 22, 1990	Stream
22	"Computers on Campus"	March 29, 1990	Stream
23	"High Tech France: Part 1"	April 25, 1990	Stream
24	"High Tech France: Part 2"	May 2, 1990	Stream
25	"Computer Bowl II: Part 1"	May 17, 1990	Stream
26	"Computer Bowl II: Part 2"	May 24, 1990	Stream

=== Season 8 (1990–91) ===
No. in season	Title	Original release date	Internet Archive identifier
1	"The Global Software Market"	October 2, 1990	Stream
2	"Windows 3.0"	October 9, 1990	Stream
3	"Hypertext"	October 16, 1990	Stream
4	"Rebirth of the Home Computer"	October 23, 1990	Stream
5	"Palmtop Computers"	October 30, 1990	Stream
6	"Input Devices"	November 6, 1990	Stream
7	"The Amiga 3000"	November 13, 1990	Stream
8	"Consumer Buying Guide (1990)"	November 27, 1990	Stream
9	"Memory Management"	December 4, 1990	Stream
10	"Video Game Consoles"	December 11, 1990	Stream
11	"Viruses"	December 18, 1990	Stream
12	"Speech Technology"	January 8, 1991	Stream
13	"Macros"	January 29, 1991	Stream
14	"CD-ROM Software (1991)"	February 19, 1991	Stream
15	"Sleeper Software"	February 26, 1991	Stream
16	"Flight Simulators (1991)"	March 5, 1991	Stream
17	"Consumer Electronics Show (CES) (1991)"	March 12, 1991	Stream
18	"Computers and Medicine"	March 19, 1991	Stream
19	"Scanners"	April 2, 1991	Stream
20	"Computers and Sports (1991)"	April 9, 1991	Stream
21	"Software in the Schools"	April 16, 1991	Stream
22	"Fonts City"	April 23, 1991	Stream
23	"Network Security"	April 30, 1991	Stream
24	"Computer Bowl III: Part 1"	June 7, 1991	Stream
25	"Computer Bowl III: Part 2"	May 14, 1991	Stream
26	"Neural Networks"	May 21, 1991	Stream

=== Season 9 (1991–92) ===
No. in season	Title	Original release date	Internet Archive identifier
1	"Macintosh System 7.0"	October 1, 1991	Stream
2	"Windows Applications"	October 8, 1991	Stream
3	"File Compression"	October 15, 1991	Stream
4	"Computer Displays"	October 22, 1991	Stream
5	"Foreign Language Software (1991)"	October 29, 1991	Stream
6	"Tandy/Radio Shack Computers"	November 5, 1991	Stream
7	"Laptops and Handhelds"	November 12, 1991	Stream
8	"Computer Games (1991)"	November 19, 1991	Stream
9	"PC Networks"	December 3, 1991	N/A
10	"Consumer Buying Guide (1991)"	December 10, 1991	Stream
11	"Groupware"	December 17, 1991	Stream
12	"Integrated Software Suites"	January 7, 1992	Stream
13	"Build Your Own PC"	January 21, 1992	Stream
14	"Computer Video"	January 28, 1992	Stream
15	"Tax Preparation Software (1992)"	February 4, 1992	Stream
16	"MIDI Music"	February 25, 1992	Stream
17	"Computers and the Disabled (1992)"	March 3, 1992	Stream
18	"Intel 486"	March 10, 1992	Stream
19	"CD-ROM Software (1992)"	March 17, 1992	Stream
20	"Space and Astronomy Software"	March 24, 1992	Stream
21	"Easy to Use Database Software"	April 7, 1992	Stream
22	"Virtual Reality"	April 21, 1992	Stream
23	"Computers and Kids (1992)"	April 28, 1992	Stream
24	"Computer Bowl IV: Part 1"	May 12, 1992	Stream
25	"Computer Bowl IV: Part 2"	May 19, 1992	Stream
26	"Diagnostic Software"	May 26, 1992	Stream
27	"Comdex Spring"	June 2, 1992	Stream

=== Season 10 (1992–93) ===
No. in season	Title	Original release date	Internet Archive identifier
1	"Computer Connectivity"	October 6, 1992	Stream
2	"Computers and Politics (1992)"	October 13, 1992	Stream
3	"Computer Speech"	October 20, 1992	N/A
4	"Windows Enhancements: Software"	October 27, 1992	Stream
5	"Windows Enhancements: Hardware"	November 3, 1992	Stream
6	"ETRE Vienna"	November 10, 1992	Stream
7	"Secrets of Word Perfect"	November 17, 1992	Stream
8	"Consumer Buying Guide (1992)"	December 1, 1992	Stream
9	"Comdex Fall"	December 8, 1992	Stream
10	"Notebook Computers"	December 15, 1992	Stream (alternative link)
11	"New Age Spreadsheets" "New Generation Spreadsheets"	January 5, 1993	Stream
12	"Computer Art"	January 12, 1993	Stream
13	"Beginner's Guide to Computing"	January 19, 1993	Stream
14	"Electronic Publishing"	January 26, 1993	Stream
15	"Computer Ergonomics (1993)"	February 2, 1993	Stream (alternative link)
16	"CD-ROM Software (1993)"	February 23, 1993	Stream
17	"Consumer Electronics Show (CES) (1993)"	March 2, 1993	Stream
18	"OS/2"	March 9, 1993	Stream
19	"Digital Photography"	March 23, 1993	Stream
20	"Creative Writing Software"	March 30, 1993	Stream
21	"The New Macs"	April 13, 1993	Stream
22	"Organizer Software"	April 20, 1993	Stream
23	"SPA Codie Awards (1993)"	April 27, 1993	Stream
24	"Visual Programming Languages"	May 4, 1993	Stream
25	"Self Improvement Software"	May 18, 1993	Stream
26	"Computer Bowl V: Part 1"	May 25, 1993	Stream
27	"Computer Bowl V: Part 2"	June 1, 1993	Stream

=== Season 11 (1993–94) ===
No. in season	Title	Original release date	Internet Archive identifier
1	"High Tech Israel"	September 28, 1993	Stream
2	"Baseball Software"	October 5, 1993	Stream
3	"PDAs"	October 12, 1993	Stream
4	"Pentium PCs"	October 19, 1993	Stream
5	"DOS 6.2"	October 26, 1993	Stream (alternative link)
6	"ETRE 1993 Barcelona"	November 2, 1993	Stream
7	"The Internet"	November 9, 1993	Stream (alternative link)
8	"Windows NT"	November 16, 1993	Stream (alternative link)
9	"Consumer Buying Guide (1993)"	November 30, 1993	Stream (alternative link)
10	"Buying a New Computer"	December 7, 1993	Stream (alternative link)
11	"Comdex 1993"	December 14, 1993	Stream (alternative link)
12	"Digital Journalism"	January 4, 1994	Stream (alternative link)
13	"Color Printing"	January 11, 1994	Stream (alternative link)
14	"Tax Software"	January 18, 1994	Stream (alternative link)
15	"Screen Savers and Wallpapers"	January 25, 1994	Stream (alternative link)
16	"MacWorld San Francisco 1994"	February 1, 1994	Stream
17	"Small Business Software"	February 8, 1994	Stream
18	"Software for Kids (1994)"	February 15, 1994	Stream
19	"Slots – Local Bus Video"	February 22, 1994	Stream (alternative link)
20	"Consumer Electronics Show (CES) (1994)"	March 1, 1994	Stream
21	"Green PCs"	March 8, 1994	Stream (alternative link)
22	"Email/Groupware"	March 15, 1994	Stream (alternative link)
23	"Multimedia"	April 5, 1994	Stream (alternative link)
24	"CD-ROM Software (1994)"	April 12, 1994	Stream (alternative link)
25	"Foreign Language Software (1994)"	May 3, 1994	Stream (alternative link)
26	"Computer Bowl VI: Part 1"	June 7, 1994	Stream
27	"Computer Bowl VI: Part 2"	June 14, 1994	Stream (alternative link)

=== Season 12 (1994–95) ===
No. in season	Title	Original release date	Internet Archive identifier
1	"PC Expo (1994)"	September 27, 1994	Stream (alternative link)
2	"MacWorld Boston (1994)"	October 4, 1994	Stream (alternative link 1, 2)
3	"ETRE Conference Barcelona (1994)"	October 11, 1994	(alternative link 1, 2)
4	"PowerPC and PowerMac"	October 18, 1994	Stream
5	"Computer Art"	October 25, 1994	Stream
6	"Plug and Play"	November 1, 1994	Stream (alternative link 1, 2. 3)
7	"Windows 4.0 a.k.a. Windows 95"	November 8, 1994	Stream (alternative link)
8	"Virtual Meetings"	November 15, 1994	Stream (alternative link)
9	"Consumer's Buying Guide (1994)"	November 29, 1994	Stream (alternative link)
10	"Comdex Special (1994)"	December 6, 1994	Stream
11	"Talking Computers"	December 13, 1994	Stream (alternative link)
12	"Interactive Music"	January 3, 1995	Stream (alternative link 1, 2)
13	"Digital Photo Finishing"	January 10, 1995	Stream (alternative link 1, 2)
14	"Computer Games (1995)"	January 24, 1995	Stream (alternative link 1, 2)
15	"Computers and Sports (1995)"	January 31, 1995	Stream (alternative link 1, 2)
16	"Consumer Electronics Show (CES) (1995)"	February 7, 1995	Stream
17	"OS/2 Warp"	February 28, 1995	Stream (alternative link)
18	"Investment Software"	March 7, 1995	Stream (alternative link)
19	"Learning on a Computer"	March 21, 1995	Stream (alternative link 1, 2)
20	"Computer Memory"	March 28, 1995	Stream (alternative link 1, 2)
21	"SPA Codie Awards (1995)"	April 11, 1995	Stream
22	"PC Video"	April 18, 1995	Stream (alternative link 1, 2, 3)
23	"Mobile Computing"	April 25, 1995	Stream (alternative link)
24	"The Internet"	May 2, 1995	Stream (alternative link)
25	"Computer Bowl VII"	May 30, 1995	Stream
26	"Gary Kildall Special"	August 1, 1995	Stream (alternative link)

=== Season 13 (1995–96) ===
No. in season	Title	Original release date	Internet Archive identifier
1	"Windows 95"	September 26, 1995	Stream (alternative link 1, 2)
2	"Mac Clones and New OS"	October 3, 1995	Stream (alternative link 1, 2, 3, 4)
3	"Smart TV"	October 10, 1995	Stream (alternative link 1, 2, 3)
4	"Computers and Healthcare"	October 17, 1995	Stream (alternative link)
5	"Silicon Glen"	October 24, 1995	N/A
6	"Computing Seniors"	October 31, 1995	Stream
7	"Buy or Upgrade?"	November 7, 1995	Stream (alternative link)
8	"Computer Games (1995)"	November 14, 1995	Stream (alternative link)
9	"ETRE Conference Madrid (1995): Part 1"	November 28, 1995	Stream
10	"Consumer's Buying Guide (1995)"	December 5, 1995	Stream (alternative link)
11	"Comdex Special (1995)"	December 12, 1995	Stream (alternative link)
12	"PC Troubleshooting"	January 2, 1996	Stream
13	"Information Overload"	January 9, 1996	Stream (alternative link 1, 2)
14	"Computers and Kids (1996)"	January 16, 1996	Stream (alternative link)
15	"ETRE Conference Madrid (1995): Part 2"	January 23, 1996	Stream (alternative link)
16	"SOHO Software"	January 30, 1996	Stream (alternative link)
17	"Consumer Electronics Show (CES) (1996)"	February 6, 1996	Stream (alternative link)
18	"Online Tips"	February 13, 1996	Stream (alternative link 1, 2)
19	"Financial Software"	February 20, 1996	Stream (alternative link)
20	"Silicon Glen: Part 2"	March 5, 1996	Stream
21	"Software Thinking Tools"	March 12, 1996	Stream
22	"Cars and Computers"	March 19, 1996	Stream
23	"SPA Codie Awards (1996)"	April 2, 1996	Stream
24	"The New PCs"	April 23, 1996	Stream
25	"Computer Bowl VIII"	June 4, 1996	Stream
26	"E3 Special"	June 18, 1996	Stream (alternative link)

=== Season 14 (1996–97) ===
No. in season	Title	Original release date	Internet Archive identifier
1	"MacWorld Boston (1996)"	September 24, 1996	Stream
2	"Cyber Cafes"	October 1, 1996	Stream
3	"Internet Telephony"	October 8, 1996	Stream
4	"Search Engines"	October 15, 1996	Stream
5	"IT Forum, Paris"	October 22, 1996	N/A
6	"Cyber Politics"	October 29, 1996	Stream
7	"Online Shopping"	November 5, 1996	Stream (alternative link)
8	"ETRE Conference Berlin (1996)"	November 12, 1996	Stream
9	"Consumer's Buying Guide (1996)"	December 3, 1996	Stream
10	"Digital Photography"	December 10, 1996	Stream
11	"Computer Games (1996)"	December 31, 1996	Stream
12	"Internet TV"	January 7, 1997	Stream
13	"Comdex Special (1996)"	January 14, 1997	Stream (alternative link)
14	"Wireless Computing"	January 27, 1997	Stream
15	"Sports Simulation Software"	January 28, 1997	Stream
16	"Cyber Dating"	February 4, 1997	Stream
17	"Consumer Electronics Show (CES) (1997)"	February 11, 1997	Stream
18	"Airline Magazine Software"	February 18, 1997	N/A
19	"E-Mail"	February 25, 1997	Stream
20	"Computers and the Disabled (1997)"	March 4, 1997	Stream
21	"Cyber Music"	March 11, 1997	Stream
22	"SPA Codie Awards (1997)"	March 25, 1997	Stream
23	"Cyber Art"	April 15, 1997	Stream
24	"Cyber Security"	April 22, 1997	Stream
25	"Website Creation"	May 6, 1997	Stream
26	"Computer Bowl IX: Part 1"	June 3, 1997	Stream
27	"Computer Bowl IX: Part 2"	June 10, 1997	Stream
28	"Internet Showcase Special"	June 24, 1997	Stream

=== Season 15 (1997–98) ===
No. in season	Title	Original release date	Internet Archive identifier
1	"Push Technology"	October 7, 1997	Stream
2	"Internet Advertising"	October 14, 1997	N/A
3	"Java Tools"	October 21, 1997	Stream
4	"Virtual Universities"	October 28, 1997	Stream
5	"Cyber Fiction"	November 4, 1997	Stream
6	"ETRE Conference Budapest (1997): Part 1"	November 11, 1997	N/A
7	"ETRE Conference Budapest (1997): Part 2"	November 18, 1997	N/A
8	"Electronic Commerce"	November 25, 1997	Stream
9	"Battle of the Browsers"	December 2, 1997	Stream (alternative link)
10	"Consumer's Buying Guide"	December 9, 1997	N/A
11	"Comdex Special (1997)"	December 16, 1997	Stream
12	"Web Plug-ins"	January 13, 1998	Stream
13	"Cyber Privacy"	January 20, 1998	Stream
14	"Putting Your Business Online"	January 27, 1998	Stream
15	"Online Games"	February 3, 1998	Stream (alternative link)
16	"Home Design Software"	February 10, 1998	Stream
17	"Storage Solutions"	February 17, 1998	Stream
18	"Internet Showcase, San Diego"	February 24, 1998	N/A
19	"My Web Site"	March 17, 1998	Stream
20	"Desktop Video"	March 24, 1998	Stream
21	"Online Travel Planning"	March 31, 1998	Stream
22	"SPA Codie Awards (1998)"	April 21, 1998	Stream
23	"Doc in a Box – Healthcare Software"	April 28, 1998	Stream
24	"Computer Bowl X: Part 1"	May 5, 1998	Stream
25	"Computer Bowl X: Part 2"	May 12, 1998	Stream
26	"Digital Living Room"	July 14, 1998	Stream

=== Season 16 (1998–99) ===
No. in season	Title	Original release date	Internet Archive identifier
1	"Windows 98"	October 6, 1998	Stream
2	"Mac Update"	October 13, 1998	Stream
3	"Software Secrets"	October 20, 1999	Stream
4	"Internet Video Telephony"	October 27, 1998	Stream (alternative link)
5	"ETRE Conference Lisbon (1998): Part 1"	November 3, 1998	Stream
6	"ETRE Conference Lisbon (1998): Part 2"	November 10, 1998	Stream
7	"Web Radio"	November 17, 1998	Stream
8	"Consumer's Buying Guide (1998)"	November 24, 1998	Stream
9	"PDAs and Handhelds"	December 1, 1998	Stream
10	"Bill Gates Profile"	December 8, 1998	Stream
11	"Comdex Special (1998)"	December 15, 1998	Stream (alternative link)
12	"E-Commerce"	December 22, 1998	Stream
13	"3D Graphics"	January 12, 1999	Stream
14	"Digital Photography"	January 19, 1999	Stream
15	"Computing for Parents"	January 26, 1999	Stream (alternative link)
16	"Tax Preparation Software"	February 2, 1999	Stream
17	"Fixing Your PC"	February 9, 1999	Stream
18	"Speech Technology"	February 16, 1999	Stream
19	"Internet Showcase (1999)"	February 23, 1999	Stream
20	"Y2K"	March 16, 1999	Stream (alternative link)
21	"SPA Codie Awards (1999)"	March 23, 1999	Stream (alternative link)
22	"Programming Languages"	April 13, 1999	Stream
23	"Creativity Software"	April 20, 1999	Stream
24	"E-Mail Update"	April 27, 1999	Stream

=== Season 17 (1999–2000) ===
No. in season	Title	Original release date	Internet Archive identifier
1	"Computer Games (1999)"	October 12, 1999	Stream
2	"DVDs"	October 19, 1999	Stream
3	"TV Meets PC"	October 26, 1999	Stream
4	"Computer Crime"	November 2, 1999	Stream
5	"Digital Home Movies"	November 9, 1999	Stream
6	"Robots"	November 16, 1999	Stream
7	"Consumer's Buying Guide (1999)"	November 23, 1999	Stream
8	"ETRE Conference Monte Carlo (1999): Part 1"	November 30, 1999	Stream
9	"ETRE Conference Monte Carlo (1999): Part 2"	December 7, 1999	Stream
10	"Comdex Special (1999)"	December 14, 1999	Stream
11	"Copyright Issues Online"	January 4, 2000	Stream
12	"Home Networks"	January 11, 2000	Stream
13	"ETRE Conference Monaco (1999): Part 3"	January 18, 2000	Stream
14	"Faster Net Access"	January 25, 2000	Stream
15	"Music on the PC"	February 1, 2000	Stream
16	"Computers without Keyboards"	February 8, 2000	Stream
17	"Internet Showcase Special (2000): Part 1"	February 15, 2000	Stream
18	"Internet Showcase Special (2000): Part 2"	February 22, 2000	Stream
19	"Cooking with Your PC"	February 29, 2000	Stream
20	"Online Investing"	March 21, 2000	Stream
21	"Computers and Politics (2000)"	March 28, 2000	Stream
22	"Users Group Dayton Special"	April 4, 2000	Stream
23	"Digital Living Room: Part 1"	July 25, 2000	Stream
24	"Digital Living Room: Part 2"	August 1, 2000	Stream

=== Season 18 (2000–01) ===
No. in season	Title	Original release date	Internet Archive identifier
1	"ETRE Conference Prague (2000): Part 1"	November 21, 2000	Stream
2	"ETRE Conference Prague (2000): Part 2"	November 28, 2000	Stream
3	"Consumer's Buying Guide (2000)"	December 5, 2000	Stream
4	"MP3 Secrets"	December 12, 2000	Stream
5	"ETRE Conference Prague (2000): Part 3"	December 26, 2000	Stream
6	"Online Gaming"	January 2, 2001	Stream
7	"Privacy Online"	January 9, 2001	Stream
8	"High Tech Hawaii: Part 1"	January 30, 2001	Stream
9	"High Tech Hawaii: Part 2"	February 6, 2001	Stream
10	"High Tech Hawaii: Part 3"	February 13, 2001	Stream
11	"High Tech Hawaii: Part 4"	February 20, 2001	Stream
12	"Creating Your Own Website (2001)"	February 27, 2001	Stream
13	"Consumer Electronics Show (CES) (2001)"	March 6, 2001	Stream
14	"Wireless Technology"	March 20, 2001	Stream
15	"Finding a Job Online"	March 27, 2001	Stream
16	"Security and Viruses"	April 3, 2001	Stream
17	"Online Universities"	May 1, 2001	Stream
18	"Guide to Online Auctions"	May 8, 2001	Stream
19	"Ultimate Gaming PC"	June 5, 2001	Stream
20	"Interactive TV"	June 12, 2001	Stream

=== Season 19 (2001–02) ===
No. in season	Title	Original release date	Internet Archive identifier
1	"Technology and the Church: Part 1"	September 18, 2001	Stream
2	"Technology and the Church: Part 2"	September 25, 2001	Stream
3	"Technology and the Church: Part 3"	October 2, 2001	Stream
4	"Computers and the Pentagon (2001): Part 1"	November 13, 2001	Stream
5	"Computers and the Pentagon (2001): Part 2"	November 20, 2001	Stream
6	"ETRE Conference Rome (2001): Part 1"	November 27, 2001	Stream
7	"ETRE Conference Rome (2001): Part 2"	December 4, 2001	Stream
8	"ETRE Conference Rome (2001): Part 3"	January 1, 2002	Stream
9	"ETRE Conference Rome (2001): Part 4"	January 8, 2002	Stream
10	"Computers & Your Health"	January 15, 2002	Stream
11	"Easy Webcams"	January 22, 2002	Stream
12	"Medicine & Technology"	January 29, 2002	Stream
13	"Operating System & Browser Updates"	February 5, 2002	Stream
14	"Computers and the 2002 Olympics: Part 1"	February 26, 2002	Stream
15	"Computers and the 2002 Olympics: Part 2"	March 5, 2002	Stream
16	"Online Travel Tips"	March 19, 2002	Stream
17	"Preventing Spam"	March 26, 2002	Stream
18	"High Tech Singapore: Part 1"	June 11, 2002	Stream
19	"High Tech Singapore: Part 2"	June 18, 2002	Stream
20	"High Tech Singapore: Part 3"	June 25, 2002	Stream
