= Parasitic Engineering =

Defunct American computer company

Parasitic Engineering, Inc.
- Type: Private
- Industry: Computer
- Founded: 1974; 52 years ago in Oakland, California, United States
- Founders: Howard Fullmer; Gene Nardi
- Defunct: 1983; 43 years ago
- Fate: Dissolution
- Headquarters: Albany, California
- Products: Equinox 100
- Number of employees: 9 (1977)

Parasitic Engineering, Inc., was an American computer company founded by Howard Fullmer and Gene Nardi in 1974. Named as a tongue-in-cheek reference to a comment by MITS co-founder Ed Roberts, Parasitic's first products were hardware upgrade kits to MITS' Altair 8800 microcomputer kit, improving the latter's power supply rating and susceptibility to noise. The company later released their own microcomputer based on the same bus as the Altair, the S-100, but it was less popular than the company's hardware-improvement kits. By 1979, the company had pivoted to providing upgrades to Tandy's TRS-80. Parasitic went defunct in 1983. The company's microcomputer, the Equinox 100, was designed in collaboration with George Morrow and released in 1977.

== Foundation (1976–1977) ==
Howard Fullmer (born c. 1947) and Gene Nardi (born c. 1948) founded Parasitic Engineering in 1974. The two business partners had met at the University of California, Berkeley, where they both worked in the university's department of psychology as computer consultants. The company was originally based out of the basement of Fullmer's Oakland, California, house. The company acted as a side job for the founders for the first two years of existence. When the company's profits increased significantly in 1976, the two quit their day jobs and focused on Parasitic as a full-time job. In 1977, Parasitic employed nine people and took in $250,000 in gross profit.

Parasitic's name, conceived later in 1976, was a swipe at MITS co-founder Ed Roberts, who, in a 1975 article of his corporate newsletter Computer Notes, derided third-party hardware vendors of his microcomputer products as "parasite companies". Roberts was most likely primarily alluding to Processor Technology, a company whose first product was a 4-KB static RAM board plug-compatible with MITS' influential Altair 8800 kit microcomputer. MITS' response to Processor Technology's board was a dynamic RAM board, outfit with an identical amount of memory as well as including on ROM Microsoft's BASIC, a popular high-level programming environment which MITS had the rights to sell. The latter was a co-marketing stunt attempting to make the board more lucrative, as MITS had been selling standalone copies of BASIC for over three times the cost. However, MITS' dynamic RAM board was fraught with technical issues, and many hobbyists had been making use of pirated copies of Microsoft BASIC anyway. The dynamic RAM board was a flop for MITS and barely made a dent in Processor Technology's profits. Fulmer originally envisioned the friendlier-sounding name Symbiotic Engineering but chose against it, wanting to avoid ties to the Symbionese Liberation Army, a radical left-wing terrorist group active at the time of the company's conception. (Note: Coincidentally, a Santa Cruz–based company by the name of Symbiotic Systems, Inc., released the S-100-based Syncron 8 microcomputer in 1977 (Symbiotic Systems 1977).)

Parasitic Engineering's first product was a clock controller board for the Altair 8800, released in 1976. Fulmer designed it as a "permanent fix-kit" for the computer, alleviating issues on the Altair's clock oscillator caused by noise, temperature variations, and various other fluctuations. In 1977, Parasitic introduced its second product, a modification kit for the Altair's power supply, improving its power rating and robustness by replacing the computer's stock linear regulators with a constant-voltage transformer (supported by a beefy electrolytic capacitor and bridge rectifiers). This power supply modification paired nicely with Processor Technology's static RAM board, which was relatively power-hungry compared to the dynamic RAM board that MITS supplied.

Parasitic established dealer channels in Europe in 1977 as part of an effort to rival European and Japanese computer companies that had been making inroads in the continent during that period. The company project profits of $1,000,000 in 1978.

== Equinox 100 (1977–1979) ==
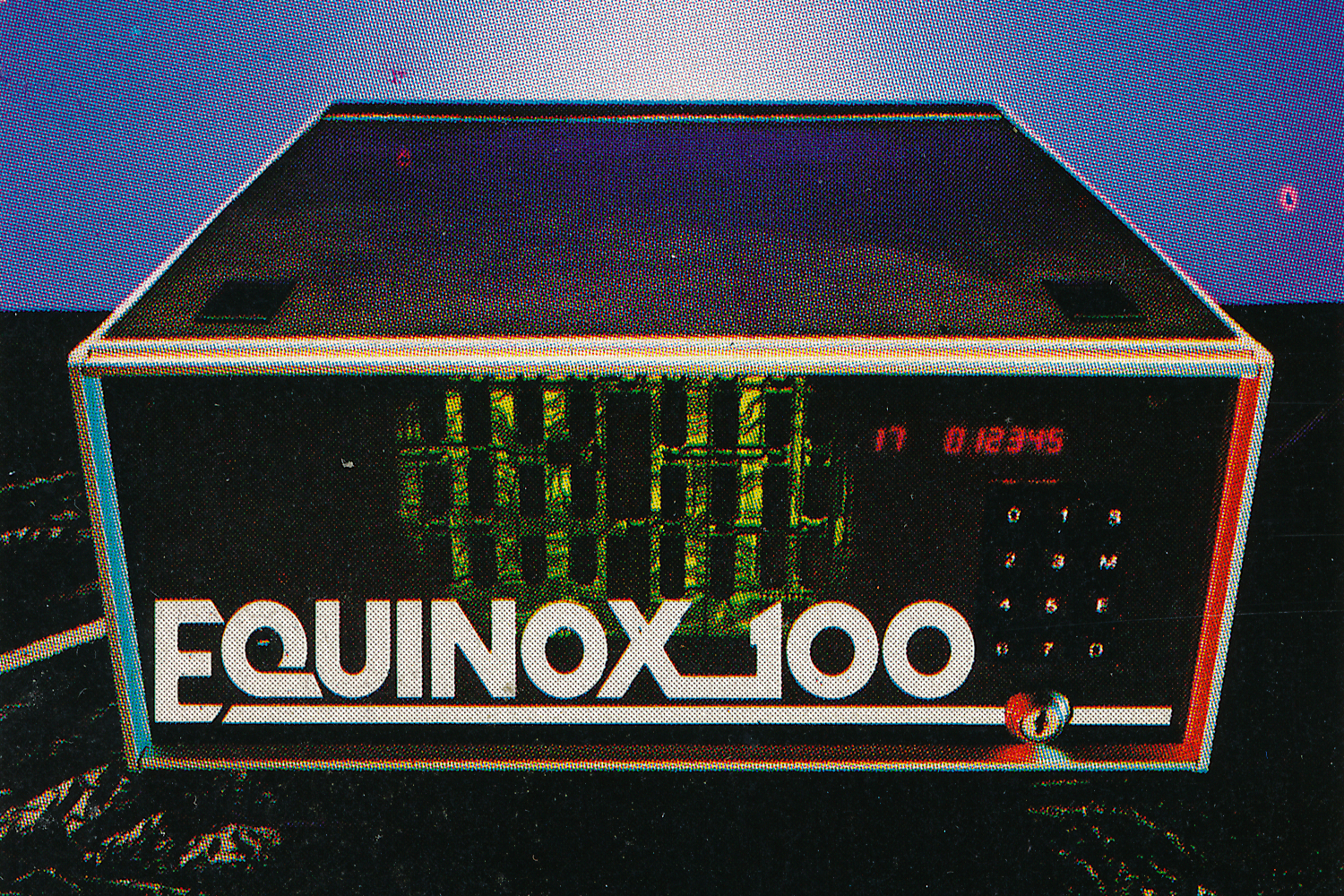
Front view of Parasitic Engineering's Equinox 100

In June 1977, Fulmer teamed up with George Morrow, a fellow third-party Altair hardware supplier, to design and build a full-fledged microcomputer. Their efforts culminated in 1977 in the Equinox 100, a microcomputer sold by Parasitic Engineering based on the S-100 bus—a computer architecture introduced with the Altair 8800. The computer featured an Intel 8080 microprocessor, twenty S-100 slots, 4 KB of RAM, a built-in hexadecimal keypad with a seven-segment LED readout, RS-232 serial and parallel ports, and a cassette interface. Parasitic's cassette operating system for the computer was named COPE, short for Cassette Operating Executive.

The Equinox 100 was largely built around circuit boards that Morrow had already designed, while Fulmer provided his electrical engineering expertise in designing the rest of the system. The system was solidly built, the two designers taking notes from computer mogul Bill Godbout and Diablo Data's Bob Mullen on how to make the S-100 bus more robust. By the time of the Equinox's release, hobbyists and corporate buyers had begun to see the Intel 8080 as antiquated compared to Zilog's Z80 microprocessor, however, and the computer sold poorly as a result. The insight on how to improve the S-100 bus standard during the process of designing the Equinox 100 nonetheless prompted Morrow and Fulmer to lobby for a formal specification for the S-100 bus, which eventually became ratified as IEEE 696 in 1982, under their partial authorship.

== Pivot and decline (1979–1983) ==
Parasitic by 1979 had changed its corporate headquarters to Albany, California. The company at this time began a pivot to providing after-market hardware upgrades to the TRS-80, a microcomputer line marketed by Tandy Corporation through their Radio Shack stores and catalogs. One of the first products Parasitic offered for the TRS-80 was an 8-inch floppy drive system called the Maxi-Disk, making use of a drive manufactured by Shugart Associates, while the expansion card interface was manufactured by Parasitic. In 1982, the pivot was fully complete, Parasitic offering more disk drives, boards that added functionality to the CP/M implementation for the TRS-80, and a "data separator" board that reportedly eliminated read errors with high-density 5.25-inch floppy drives on the TRS-80.

The company dissolved when it was suspended from the Franchise Tax Board of California in 1983. Philip H. Dorn of Datamation writer attributed the fall of Parasitic Engineering—as with many other companies that sprung from the success of the Altair—to the IBM Personal Computer becoming a commodity after its release in 1981, leading to the maturation of the microcomputer market where hobbyist-centric companies had difficulty competing.
