= The Tech (newspaper) =

Student newspaper of MIT

- Front page of The Tech (April 9, 2010)
- Type: Student newspaper
- School: Massachusetts Institute of Technology
- Founded: November 16, 1881; 144 years ago
- Language: English
- Headquarters: 84 Massachusetts Avenue; Room W20-483
- City: Cambridge, Massachusetts 02139
- Country: United States
- ISSN: 0148-9607
- OCLC number: 3406944
- Website: thetech.com
- Free online archives: thetech.com/issues/

The Tech, first published on November 16, 1881, is the student newspaper at the Massachusetts Institute of Technology in Cambridge, Massachusetts. Editions are published biweekly on Thursdays throughout the academic year and about once a month over the summer. The Tech established an early presence on the World Wide Web, and continues to publish online in tandem with the print edition.

== Print edition ==
Printed copies are distributed throughout the MIT campus on the morning of publication. Since February 2015 the newspaper publishes weekly, reduced from its previous twice-weekly frequency. The online website is updated more frequently.

Since Fall 2015, The Tech has been printed by Turley Publications. From 2014 to 2015, the newspaper was printed by Upper Valley Press, after MassWeb Printing was acquired. From 2010 to 2014, the newspaper was printed by the Mass Web Printing Company, a unit of Phoenix Media/Communications Group, previously the publisher of the Boston Phoenix. From 2000-2009, the newspaper was printed by Charles River Publishing in Charlestown and briefly by Saltus Press in Worcester, after Saltus acquired Charles River Publishing. It is currently printed by Graphic Developments, Inc.

== Web edition ==
The Tech newspaper was an early publisher on the World Wide Web, first publishing online in 1993. Earlier, StarText, the Fort Worth Star-Telegram's videotex system which displayed newspaper content on computer screens, began in 1982 in Fort Worth, Texas (but did not go on the Internet until 1996). In 1987, the Middlesex News (Framingham, Massachusetts) launched Fred the Computer, a single-line BBS system used to preview the next day's edition and later to organize the newspaper's past film reviews.

Nearly every published issue of The Tech is available online, and most issues are accessible as PDF files, including the first issue, edited by Arthur W. Walker, which was originally printed by Alfred Mudge & Son, Printers, located at 34 School Street in Boston.

== Notable alumni ==
- Karen W. Arenson – education writer for The New York Times
- Wesley Chan – prominent venture capitalist and Google Analytics and Google Voice founder
- Noam Chomsky – father of modern linguistics - world-wide author and lecturer on world politics
- Lynn Yamada Davis – known as “Lynja”; celebrity chef and TikToker
- Simson L. Garfinkel – writer for Technology Review, Wired, and the Boston Globe
- James R. Killian, Jr. – 10th president of MIT
- Steve Kirsch – entrepreneur and philanthropist
- Harry Ward Leonard – electrical engineer and inventor
- Arthur Dehon Little – founded the consulting company Arthur D. Little and was instrumental in developing chemical engineering at MIT
- Patrick Joseph McGovern, Jr. – chairman and founder of International Data Group (IDG)
- Paul Schindler - American journalist known for being the software reviewer on the popular television program Computer Chronicles
- Larry Stark (pseudonym Charles Foster Ford) – Boston theater critic who started writing for The Tech in the years 1962-64
- Len Tower Jr. – founding board member of the Free Software Foundation, and activist with the GNU Project
