= Popular Computing =

Magazine about computers published from 1981 to 1985

- Frequency: Monthly
- Publisher: McGraw-Hill, Inc.
- First issue: November 1981; 44 years ago
- Final issue: December 1985; 40 years ago
- Country: United States
- Based in: Peterborough, New Hampshire
- ISSN: 0279-4721

Popular Computing was a monthly computer magazine published from 1981 to 1985 by McGraw-Hill, Inc. Popular Computing was the successor to McGraw-Hill's quarterly journal onComputing. It focused on covering general interest personal computing topics in an accessible manner.

== Overview ==
Popular Computing's predecessor onComputing ran for ten issues from 1979 to 1981 and marketed itself as a "guide to personal computing." The magazine rebranded as Popular Computing and switched to a new staff and monthly schedule to fully cover the rapidly expanding and increasingly popular field of personal computing. Popular Computing aimed to "demythologize" personal computing with accessible coverage on consumer advice, news, gaming, historical essays, and contemporary developments.

McGraw-Hill positioned Popular Computing as an accessible, non-technical magazine for a general interest readership, alongside Byte, its specialized magazine for more technically-inclined readers.

=== Circulation ===
In 1983, Popular Computing was the world's second-highest circulation computer magazine behind Computers & Electronics, with a paid circulation of 460,000. In 1984, 89% of Popular Computing subscribers were male, and the magazine published an article in its September 1984 edition about the gender disparity in computing. In October 1984, the National Library Service for the Blind and Handicapped began distributing a braille edition of Popular Computing. At the time of its closure in December 1985, Popular Computing was one of the four largest personal computer magazines, with a circulation of about 250,000 to 270,000.

=== Writers ===
Notable contributing writers to Popular Computing included:

- Isaac Asimov
- Richard Benyo
- Pete Carey
- Chris Crawford
- Richard Dalton
- Thom Hartmann
- Steven Levy
- Peter McWilliams
- Dale Peterson
- Jerry Pournelle
- Randall Rothenberg
- Robert Swirsky
- David Weinberger
- George Zebrowski

McWilliams stopped writing for the magazine due to a disagreement with its editorial stance, which he felt homogenized articles into inoffensive, monotone prose.

== Closure ==
McGraw-Hill ceased publication of the magazine after the December 1985 issue, stating that its "resources would be better applied to other areas in the microcomputer field which have better prospects for growth." In its final months, Popular Computing attempted to shift its focus from general interest readers towards business users. McGraw-Hill failed to find a buyer for the magazine and its advertising "fell 29% during the first half of 1985." Popular Computing had been operating at a loss for two years with no reversal expected, and McGraw-Hill decided to end the magazine just before the December 1985 issue went to press. According to a McGraw-Hill public relations director, Popular Computing struggled because it was competing with too many general interest computer magazines. As the computer industry matured, advertisers became more sophisticated about targeting markets and broadened their focus to television and newspapers.
