= Karen Arenson =

American journalist (born 1949)

- Born: Karen W. Arenson; 1949 (age 76–77); Long Island, New York, U.S.
- Education: Massachusetts Institute of Technology
- Occupation: Journalist

Karen W. Arenson (born 1949) is an American retired journalist for The New York Times.

== Early life and education ==
Arenson was born in 1949 on Long Island, New York. She earned an undergraduate degree in economics from the Massachusetts Institute of Technology in 1970, where she was an editor for the student newspaper, The Tech. In 1972, she received a master's degree in public policy from the John F. Kennedy School of Government at Harvard University.

== Career ==
Arenson spent most of her career as a reporter covering higher education for The New York Times. She began with the newspaper in 1978, and retired from her position in May 2008. The Chronicle of Higher Education called Arenson "one of the most visible higher-education reporters in the country" during the twelve years she covered higher education for the NY Times. According to the Chronicle: "She was one of the first journalists in the mainstream press to write about early decision in admissions, the aggressive investments colleges were making with their endowments, and the growth of for-profit colleges."

In 2005, Arenson was the first to report on the results of a widely reported committee investigating antisemitism related to Joseph Massad at Columbia University. It had been provided by Columbia officials before its official release on the condition that she did not "seek reaction from other interested parties" including the students who had lodged the complaints, though Columbia agreed to allow a professor who had "exceeded commonly accepted bounds of behavior" to respond. The Times was obliged to append a note detailing a departure from its policy that "writers are not permitted to forgo follow-up reporting in exchange for information", which they noted Arenson and editors had not recalled.
