= Richard Dalton (editor) =

Editor

Richard Dalton was a former editor of the Whole Earth Software Review. He was president of Keep/Track Corporation (Falmouth, Massachusetts) when he died of prostate cancer on Oct. 24 2016, age 76. For nine years he was a research affiliate of the Institute for the Future in Menlo Park, California specializing in emerging technologies and their business and social implications. He was a featured columnist for InformationWeek and Windows Magazine, and also wrote a column for Byte.com. He had previously been a keynote speaker at Comdex, the Groupware Users Exchange, the InterClass European Conference and the Federal Government Group Decision Technology Conference.

In the early 1980s, Dalton advocated the use of inexpensive CP/M computers such as the Kaypro II and Morrow Designs MD-1 for businesses.

Dalton worked, without credit, on nearly all 183 software reviews presented by Paul Schindler on Computer Chronicles from 1983-1992.
