= Robert Swirsky =

American computer scientist

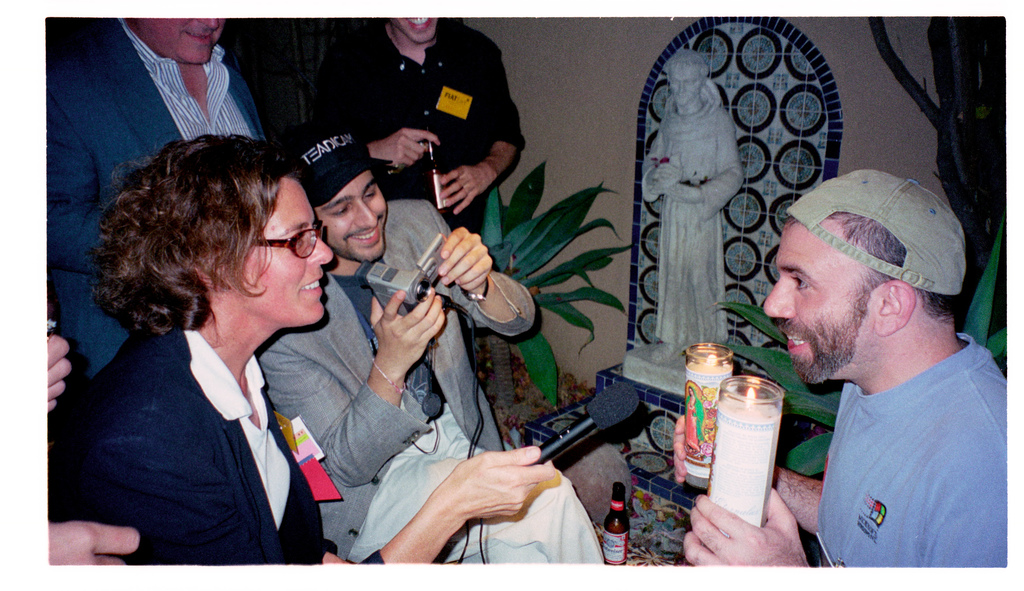
Robert Swirsky (right) being interviewed at SIGGRAPH by Coco Conn

Robert Swirsky (born December, 1962, Brooklyn, NY) is a computer scientist, author and pianist. In the early 1980s, he was one of the first regular contributors to the nascent computer magazine industry, including Popular Computing, Kilobaud Microcomputing, and Interface Age to Creative Computing.

Swirsky holds bachelor's and master's degrees in computer science from Hofstra University, and is one of Hofstra's Alumni of Distinction. While there, he met VOIP pioneer Jeff Pulver who attended Hofstra as an undergraduate student. After graduating, Swirsky worked on projects ranging from aircraft avionics to one of the first all-software digital radio receivers for a VLF submarine application.

In 1989, Swirsky moved to California and joined Olivetti Advanced Technology's Unix group. He was a frequent speaker at Uniforum, Usenix, and other Unix shows, and hosted parties where he entertained people with song parodies about the Unix computer operating system, some of which were featured in a special Evatone Soundsheet issue of Interface Age magazine. He studied music and piano at Hofstra University with professor Morton Estrin.

After Olivetti, Swirsky went to Adobe Systems, where he was a member of the core PostScript team, and the team that developed the first versions of Photoshop for Microsoft Windows, including Win32s on Microsoft Windows for Workgroups 3.11. His work made him a participant in many industry standards committees, such as TWAIN, and he was a frequent speaker and contributor at ACM SIGGRAPH events. Before leaving Adobe in 1998, he worked with Will Harvey on HTML rendering technology.

== The Disney years ==
In 1998, Swirsky began working for Walt Disney Imagineering R&D as Director, Creative Technology, under Bran Ferren, developing electronic games and digital imaging systems. He developed technology to play interactive games synchronized with live television shows, and electronic toys including Disney's Magical Moments Pin. His digital photography projects included systems to synchronize picture-taking with ride vehicles, and active infrared badges to identify picture-takers.

Swirsky was a major technical contributor to ABC's Enhanced TV, an Emmy Award-winning technology that allowed television viewers to play along with game shows and sporting events, and to answer live polls during talk shows. His interactive media research also involved working with nerdcore rapper Monzy, then an intern at Walt Disney Imagineering, on a variety of cutting-edge display technologies, including the display of digital data on a spherical surface.

Swirsky continues to work as a consultant for the themed entertainment industry, including Disney.

== 3D photography ==
Swirsky is known for his work in 3D digital photography. He has developed algorithms for generating full-color anaglyph images from stereo pairs that can be viewed through red/cyan glasses. A popular freeware program, Callipygian 3D, is widely used and has been featured on TechTV's The Screen Savers show several times, with Swirsky demonstrating it. The popularity of anaglyph images from Mars, and of anaglyph movies like Spy Kids 3D, introduced new audiences to anaglyph technology. Swirsky's software played a major role in enabling people to create their own anaglyph images.

== Production company ==
In 2003, Swirsky started a production company, Thrill Science, Inc. "Thrill Science"., to produce and distribute short films and related media for the portable media player market. The company has a 20-acre (81,000 m^{2}) lot adjacent to Walt Disney World in Florida. The property, known as Swampworth, is used as a filming location for productions, and as a studio for Swirsky's other projects.

== Code used in The Terminator ==
Some of Swirsky's computer code, from the May 1984 issue of 73 Magazine, was used in the movie The Terminator in a scene where COBOL code was briefly displayed.
