= Tim Bajarin =

American technology columnist and technology consultant

- Born: Timothy Paul Bajarin; May 4, 1950 (age 76); Santa Clara County, California, U.S.
- Occupation: Technology Industry Analyst
- Children: Ben Bajarin

Timothy Paul Bajarin is an American technology columnist and a technology consultant. His writing and analysis has been on the forefront of the digital revolution. He was one of the first analysts to cover the personal computer industry and is considered one of the leading experts in the field of technology adoption life cycles. He is president of a technology company called Creative Strategies, located in Campbell, California.

He is a leading columnist for PC Magazine and Time Magazine. He also contributed in some episodes of the Computer Chronicles.

== Career ==
Bajarin is a futurist and is credited with predicting the desktop publishing revolution three years before it reached the market and multimedia.

He has been with Creative Strategies since 1981 and has served as a consultant to most of the leading hardware and software vendors in the industry including IBM, Apple Inc., Xerox, Compaq, Dell, AT&T, Microsoft, Polaroid, Lotus, Epson, and Toshiba.

He also serves on the technology advisory boards for IBM, Compaq, and Dell.
