= Bill Godbout =

American computer scientist

- Godbout in a 1985 episode of Computer Chronicles
- Born: October 2, 1939; Providence, Rhode Island, U.S.
- Died: November 8, 2018 (aged 79); Concow, California, U.S.
- Education: Providence College; MIT
- Known for: Godbout Electronics; S-100 bus products

William Joseph Godbout (October 2, 1939 – November 8, 2018) was an American computer designer and computer company executive. He is remembered as an early computer pioneer and entrepreneur, known for manufacturing and selling computer equipment, parts, and electronic kits in Silicon Valley, during the 1970s and 1980s. He is featured in the book The Silicon Boys, 1999, by David A. Kaplan about the pioneers of Silicon Valley.

Godbout and his company, Godbout Electronics (later CompuPro and Viasyn), were very influential in the early years of the personal computer market. Together with George Morrow, he worked on the very popular S-100 bus.

== Early life ==
Godbout was born on October 2, 1939, in Providence, Rhode Island. He served in the United States Army and attended Providence College and the Massachusetts Institute of Technology (MIT).

== Career ==
Logo of Godbout Electronics

After college, Godbout went straight into a job at IBM, but found himself "involuntarily recalled" to active military duty in 1961 and subsequently spending most of the 1960s in the military, being discharged in 1968. Deciding not to return to a big company, although still holding IBM in esteem, he moved to the San Francisco Bay Area to assist in turning around a company in financial difficulties, an operation which concluded successfully. With the same team, he subsequently founded another business in Oakland, and, after selling this business, enjoyed a period of semi-retirement until a friend, Mike Quinn, introduced him to the electronics surplus business in which he became fascinated.

In 1973, Godbout established Godbout Electronics in the San Francisco Bay Area, out of a Quonset hut at Oakland International Airport. The New York Times called it a "popular electronics store." According to the Vintage Computer Federation, he was "a legend in the S-100 community for his 1970s-1980s work at Godbout Electronics and CompuPro." For his store, he purchased bulk discarded electronics largely from military suppliers. Godbout "sold chips and memory boards by mail and did business with developers on a handshake basis."

Logo of CompuPro

After renaming the company CompuPro, he worked with George Morrow to develop the S-100 data bus, the IEEE-696. The S-100 bus was sold as part of the Altair 8800 kit machine. Godbout manufactured S-100 compatible cards, which "formed the backbone of early systems like the Altair 8800 and homebrew machines, allowing techies to interface their processors and memory with peripherals and form useful microcomputers."

Logo of Viasyn

In the 1980s, Godbout focused on networking and moved his company, renamed Viasyn, to Hayward, California. He was chairman of the business. Viasyn focused on custom computing equipment for “things like medical offices, the early electronic music scene, and even niche areas like elevator control systems."

== Personal life and death ==
In 1984, Godbout was awarded an honorary Doctor of Science degree from Providence College. Later in life, he lived in the community of Concow, California, with his wife Karen. The couple had a daughter, Brandi. Godbout was a keen pilot, and would often fly planes with his friend Gary Kildall.

Godbout was killed on November 8, 2018, when the Camp Fire burned down his home and workshop in Concow. He was survived by his wife and daughter.
