= Net Cafe (TV series) =

American television series

Net Cafe (or Cheifet's Net Cafe, formerly The Internet Cafe) was a US television series documenting the internet boom of the late 1990s. It was broadcast from 1996 to 2002 and hosted by Stewart Cheifet, Jane Wither, and Andrew deVries. The show was effectively a spin-off of the PBS series Computer Chronicles.

== Episodes ==
=== Overview ===
Season	Episodes	Originally released	
Season	Episodes	First released	Last released
1	24	October 2, 1996	May 9, 1997
2	26	October 10, 1997	June 5, 1998
3	26	October 2, 1998	July 16, 1999
4	12	October 1, 1999	June 9, 2000
5	16	October 6, 2000	June 29, 2001
6	8	December 7, 2001	April 12, 2002

=== Season 1 (1996-97) ===
No. in season	Title	Original release date	Internet Archive identifier
1	"Hackers"	October 2, 1996	Stream
2	"Aliens & UFOs"	October 9, 1996	Stream
3	"Politics"	October 17, 1996	Stream
4	"Dark Side of the Net"	October 22, 1996	Stream
5	"Women on the Net"	October 28, 1996	Stream
6	"Games"	November 4, 1996	Stream
7	"VRML / 3D Worlds"	November 13, 1996	Stream
8	"Music"	November 18, 1996	Stream
9	"Movies"	December 3, 1996	Stream
10	"Writers"	December 18, 1996	Stream
11	"Comic Books"	January 10, 1997	Stream
12	"Dating and Romance"	January 17, 1997	Stream
13	"Art"	January 23, 1997	Stream
14	"Electronic Communities"	January 31, 1997	N/A
15	"Weird Science"	February 13, 1997	Stream
16	"Travel"	February 20, 1997	Stream
17	"Equality and Diversity"	February 27, 1997	Stream
18	"Censorship"	March 14, 1997	Stream
19	"The Webby Awards (1997)"	March 21, 1997	Stream
20	"Health"	March 28, 1997	Stream
21	"Religion"	April 18, 1997	N/A
22	"Weird Web"	April 25, 1997	Stream
23	"Science Fiction Online"	May 2, 1997	Stream
24	"Disinformation"	May 9, 1997	Stream

=== Season 2 (1997-98) ===
No. in season	Title	Original release date	Internet Archive identifier
1	"Online Sports"	October 10, 1997	Stream
2	"Web Radio"	October 17, 1997	Stream
3	"Privacy in Cyberspace"	October 24, 1997	Stream
4	"TV Shows Online"	October 31, 1997	Stream
5	"Finding Anyone and Anything Online"	November 10, 1997	Stream
6	"Cyber News"	November 14, 1997	N/A
7	"The Virtual Zoo"	November 21, 1997	Stream
8	"Buy It Online"	December 5, 1997	Stream
9	"The Virtual Doctor"	December 12, 1997	Stream
10	"Online Activism"	January 9, 1998	Stream
11	"Gambling and Gaming"	January 16, 1998	Stream
12	"Voyeurism Online"	January 23, 1998	Stream
13	"Grim Reaper Web Sites"	February 6, 1998	Stream
14	"Humor on the Web"	February 13, 1998	Stream
15	"War on the Web"	February 20, 1998	Stream
16	"Group Therapy Net Style"	February 27, 1998	Stream
17	"Cyber Chats"	March 20, 1998	Stream
18	"Home Improvement"	March 27, 1998	Stream
19	"Jobs & Careers"	April 3, 1998	Stream
20	"The Hollywood Connection"	April 10, 1998	Stream
21	"Space Science"	May 1, 1998	Stream
22	"Safe Kids – Safe Net"	May 8, 1998	Stream
23	"Sex Online"	May 15, 1998	Stream
24	"The Best SOHO Resources"	May 22, 1998	Stream
25	"Cool Home Pages"	May 29, 1998	Stream
26	"Money on the Web"	June 5, 1998	Stream

=== Season 3 (1998-99) ===
No. in season	Title	Original release date	Internet Archive identifier
1	"Portals"	October 2, 1998	Stream
2	"Chat Rooms"	October 9, 1998	Stream
3	"Cyber News"	October 16, 1998	Stream
4	"Cyber Sports"	October 23, 1998	Stream
5	"Cyber Communities"	October 30, 1998	Stream
6	"Investing Online"	November 6, 1998	Stream
7	"The Global Net"	November 13, 1998	Stream
8	"Virtual Stores"	December 4, 1998	Stream
9	"Food Online"	December 11, 1998	N/A
10	"Online Literature"	January 8, 1999	Stream
11	"Net Games"	January 15, 1999	Stream
12	"Adventure Travel Online"	January 22, 1999	Stream
13	"Romance Online"	March 19, 1999	N/A
14	"Cyber Kids"	March 26, 1999	N/A
15	"X-Treme Web"	April 2, 1999	Stream
16	"Incredibly Useful Sites"	April 9, 1999	Stream
17	"Humor Online"	April 16, 1999	Stream
18	"Crime and Justice"	April 23, 1999	Stream
19	"The Webby Awards (1999): Part 1"	April 30, 1999	Stream
20	"The Webby Awards (1999): Part 2"	May 7, 1999	Stream
21	"Consumer Protection Online"	June 4, 1999	Stream
22	"Performing Arts on the Web"	June 11, 1999	Stream
23	"Lions and Tigers and Bears"	June 25, 1999	Stream
24	"Hollywood on the Net"	July 2, 1999	Stream
25	"Online Collecting"	July 9, 1999	Stream
26	"New Age Sites"	July 16, 1999	Stream

=== Season 4 (1999-2000) ===
No. in season	Title	Original release date	Internet Archive identifier
1	"Lifelong Learning"	October 1, 1999	Stream
2	"Just for Fun"	October 8, 1999	Stream
3	"E-Commerce"	October 15, 1999	Stream
4	"Conspiracy Theories"	October 22, 1999	Stream
5	"Personal Finance Online"	March 10, 2000	Stream
6	"Job Hunting Online"	March 17, 2000	Stream
7	"Finding People Online"	April 7, 2000	Stream
8	"Pre-IPO Companies"	April 14, 2000	Stream
9	"New Web Entrepreneurs"	May 5, 2000	Stream
10	"Entertainment on the Web"	May 12, 2000	Stream
11	"The Webby Awards (2000): Part 1"	June 2, 2000	Stream
12	"The Webby Awards (2000): Part 2"	June 9, 2000	Stream

=== Season 5 (2000-01) ===
No. in season	Title	Original release date	Internet Archive identifier
1	"New Web Sites Part 1"	October 6, 2000	Stream
2	"New Web Sites Part 2"	October 13, 2000	Stream
3	"New Web Business Ideas Part 1"	November 3, 2000	Stream
4	"New Web Business Ideas Part 2"	November 10, 2000	Stream
5	"New Web Business Ideas Part 3"	November 17, 2000	Stream
6	"New Web Business Ideas Part 4"	November 24, 2000	Stream
7	"New Web Business Ideas Part 5"	TBA	Stream
8	"New Web Business Ideas Part 6"	March 9, 2001	Stream
9	"New Web Business Ideas Part 7"	March 30, 2001	Stream
10	"New Web Business Ideas Part 8"	April 6, 2001	Stream
11	"Hot New Web Sites Part 1"	April 27, 2001	Stream
12	"Hot New Web Sites Part 2"	May 4, 2001	Stream
13	"Hot New Web Sites Part 3"	May 25, 2001	Stream
14	"Hot New Web Sites Part 4"	June 8, 2001	Stream
15	"Internet Startups Part 1"	June 22, 2001	Stream
16	"Internet Startups Part 2"	June 29, 2001	Stream

=== Season 6 (2001-02) ===
No. in season	Title	Original release date	Internet Archive identifier
1	"State of the Web Part 1"	December 7, 2001	Stream
2	"State of the Web Part 2"	December 14, 2001	Stream
3	"New Web Sites Part 1"	January 4, 2002	Stream
4	"New Web Sites Part 2"	January 11, 2002	Stream
5	"Interesting Websites"	February 15, 2002	Stream
6	"Interesting Websites"	February 22, 2002	Stream
7	"Nicholas Negroponte Part 1"	March 29, 2002	Stream
8	"Nicholas Negroponte Part 2"	April 12, 2002	Stream
