= Larry Stark =

American journalist (born 1932)

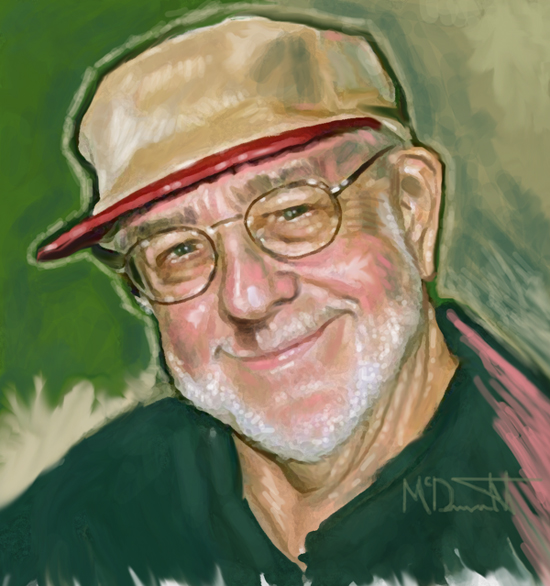
Portrait of Larry Stark by Jim McDermott

Larry Stark (born August 4, 1932 in New Brunswick, New Jersey – May 1, 2026) was an American journalist and reviewer best known for his in-depth coverage of the Boston theater scene at his website, Theater Mirror. In newspapers and online, Stark wrote hundreds of reviews of local productions and Broadway tryouts from 1962 to the present. His Boston readers have given him such labels as "head theater angel of Massachusetts" and "Dean of the alternative theater critics."

== Early work ==
In 1950 Stark discovered EC Comics (publishers of Tales From The Crypt, Weird Science, and MAD among others) and was soon writing enthusiastic letters of comment and criticism on every issue. Publisher Bill Gaines was so impressed with his critiques that he named him "EC's Official Number One Fan" and bestowed upon him a free subscription to everything EC published, provided that Stark would keep the detailed letters of review coming. EC colorist Marie Severin made a gag sign for Gaines' office that read "God help us to write stories that will please Larry Stark!" Stark’s letters were occasionally excerpted in the E.C. letters columns but EC fans wanted to read them in their entirety, as Gaines did. The first "fanzine" to satisfy that demand was Bhob Stewart and Ted White's POTRZEBIE, in which Stewart wrote that “POTRZEBIE’S main purpose in life is to present the criticism of Stark…sans censorship. You rarely get to peruse his monstrous prose other than a few sentences in the E.C. letter columns. EC values his opinions so much that Gaines has given Larry a free lifetime subscription to all the EC Comics on the condition that he will write EC a letter about each issue telling what he liked and didn’t like about it. Now you’ll know too. Thru POTRZEBIE.” Stark’s column was titled ONE MAN’S OPINION and ran through a change in editorship for POTRZEBIE, later continuing in THE EC FAN JOURNAL. Stark made several visits to the EC offices and his "Elegy" to EC, originally published in HOOHAH #6 (1956), has been reprinted over the years in multiple formats. Most recently it was included in its entirety in "American Comic Book Chronicles: The 1950s" by Bill Schelly (2013).

Between 1950 and 1956, Stark studied English at Rutgers University, leaving New Jersey for Cambridge, Massachusetts in January, 1957. In 1956-57 he co-edited the publication Stellar with Ted White, who recalled:

I lavished more care on the package than I did on the contents. The contents were good. Larry Stark was a good editor -- much better than I, then -- and when he dropped out I'd learned enough from him to keep up the standards, but the material was mostly by other people.

In the summer and fall of 1957, Stark acted in two Harvard stage productions and then worked backstage at Cambridge theaters for the next five years. In 1962, he began doing theater reviews for MIT's The Tech under the pseudonym Charles Foster Ford. During this period he used a basement mimeograph machine to print the work of local poets with his Larry Stark Press, notable for publishing Peter Guralnick's first book in 1964.

== Theater reviews ==
Stark was the first to write theater reviews for the alternative weekly, Boston After Dark, providing a continual coverage of Boston and Broadway-bound productions during the years 1966 to 1972. After circulating his own short-lived review publication, Theatre Journal, he contributed to Time Out, a free college paper published by The Cambridge Phoenix. During the 1980s, he wrote for Wisconsin's La Crosse Tribune.

Returning to the Boston area, he acquired a computer which he used to create fiction and also to write theater reviews posted on General Electric's online service, GEnie. In October 1994, he launched Theater Mirror, an informative online guide to New England theatres and stage productions. With insightful reviews and entertaining commentary by Stark, plus a continual flow of reviews submitted by several other contributors, Theater Mirror became a focal point for Boston actors, directors and theatergoers over the years. The Plays Up and Running section of Theater Mirror offers an alphabetical listing of current productions throughout New England with links to theatres from Connecticut to Maine. The Theater Mirror Archive has reviews by Stark and others dating back to 1995.

Stark's approach was much like that of film critic Pauline Kael, simply to describe "what it's about," and he often attempted to capture the essence of a play stylistically, as in this 2001 review of Conor McPherson's The Weir:

Now it's no secret the Irish is great ones for the tellin of stories, especially in them small rural bars in the Northwest country where Conor McPherson sets his hour and a half slice o'life "The Weir". Surely there's not much else to do but to drink and to gossip with a few mates of an afternoon. And once a "small one" or two's been chased down with a bottle of stout, them tales of somethin strange and maybe supernatural just come tumblin out. Better that than a lonely walk home with the wind in yer face, isn't it, now?

Stark's book, A Theater Lover's Guide to 90 Theatres in Boston, was published in 2001. For The Tech, 38 years earlier, he wrote A Guide to Harvard Square's 15 Bookstores.

On August 10, 2006, Stark was honored by the Boston theater community at a special tribute and celebration of his 74th birthday.

Stark died on May 1, 2026.

== Documentary film ==
Actress-filmmaker Bernice Liuson Sim of RedDragonfly Films released a documentary about Stark titled Stark Review: The Heart of Boston Theater. On September 17, 2006, pilot footage for Stark Review was screened for an audience of 600 in Arlington, Massachusetts, and 12 days later, Sim, Stark and co-producer Kevin Anderton discussed the Stark Review project with film critic Daniel Berman on Brookline Access Television. The film premiered April 8, 2013 at Boston's Lyric Stage.

== Watch ==
- Excerpt from Stark Review: the Heart of Boston Theater on YouTube

== Listen to ==
- Larry Stark and Geralyn Horton discuss The Women on Horton's podcast (October 8, 2006)

== Read ==
- Larry Stark (writing as Charles Foster Ford) review: Congreve's Love for Love (Loeb Drama Center) in The Tech (December 12, 1962)
- Larry Stark (as Charles Foster Ford) review: "Hollow Crown Is An Empty Evening" in The Tech (January 16, 1963)
- Larry Stark (as Ford) review: Two one-acts at the Image Theatre (Charles Street) in The Tech (February 19, 1963)
- Fiction by Larry Stark (full text of 23 stories and a novella)
