= George Morrow (computers) =

American computer scientist

- Morrow during a 1985 episode of Computer Chronicles
- Born: January 30, 1934; Detroit, Michigan, U.S.
- Died: May 7, 2003 (aged 69); San Mateo, California, U.S.
- Education: Stanford University; University of Oklahoma; UC Berkeley
- Occupations: Computer designer, computer company executive
- Years active: c. 1976–1986
- Known for: Thinker Toys; Morrow Designs
- Spouse: Michiko Jean
- Children: 3

George C. Morrow (January 30, 1934 – May 7, 2003) was an American computer designer and computer company executive, remembered as being part of the early microcomputer industry in the United States. Morrow promoted and improved the S-100 bus used in many early microcomputers. Called "one of the microcomputer industry's iconoclasts" by Richard Dalton in the Whole Earth Software Catalog, Morrow ran his own computer business, Thinker Toys, Inc., later Morrow Designs. He was also a member of the Homebrew Computer Club.

== Early life and education ==
Born in Detroit in 1934, Morrow was a high school dropout. At the age of 28, he decided to return to school, receiving a bachelor's degree in physics from Stanford University, followed by a master's degree in mathematics from the University of Oklahoma. He sought a PhD in mathematics from UC Berkeley, but while there became fascinated by computers and began working as a programmer in the computer lab there. Meanwhile, the Altair 8800 made its debut in 1975, and Morrow began attending meetings of the Homebrew Computer Club.

== Career ==
Starting in 1976, Morrow designed and sold computers, computer parts, and accessories under several company names, including Thinker Toys (changed after CBS threatened a suit as it was too close to their trademark of Tinker Toys) and restarted the business as Morrow Designs. His initial product was an Intel 8080 board with an octal-notation keypad, but it proved unappealing to hobbyists who preferred the binary notation and flip switches of the Altair 8800. Afterwards, he attempted a 16-bit machine based on the National Semiconductor PACE CPU with the help of Bill Godbout, Chuck Grant, and Mark Greenberg. Differences between him and the latter two led to their leaving to found North Star Computers. He then sold 4 KB S-100 memory boards before attempting a new computer with Howard Fullmer in 1977.

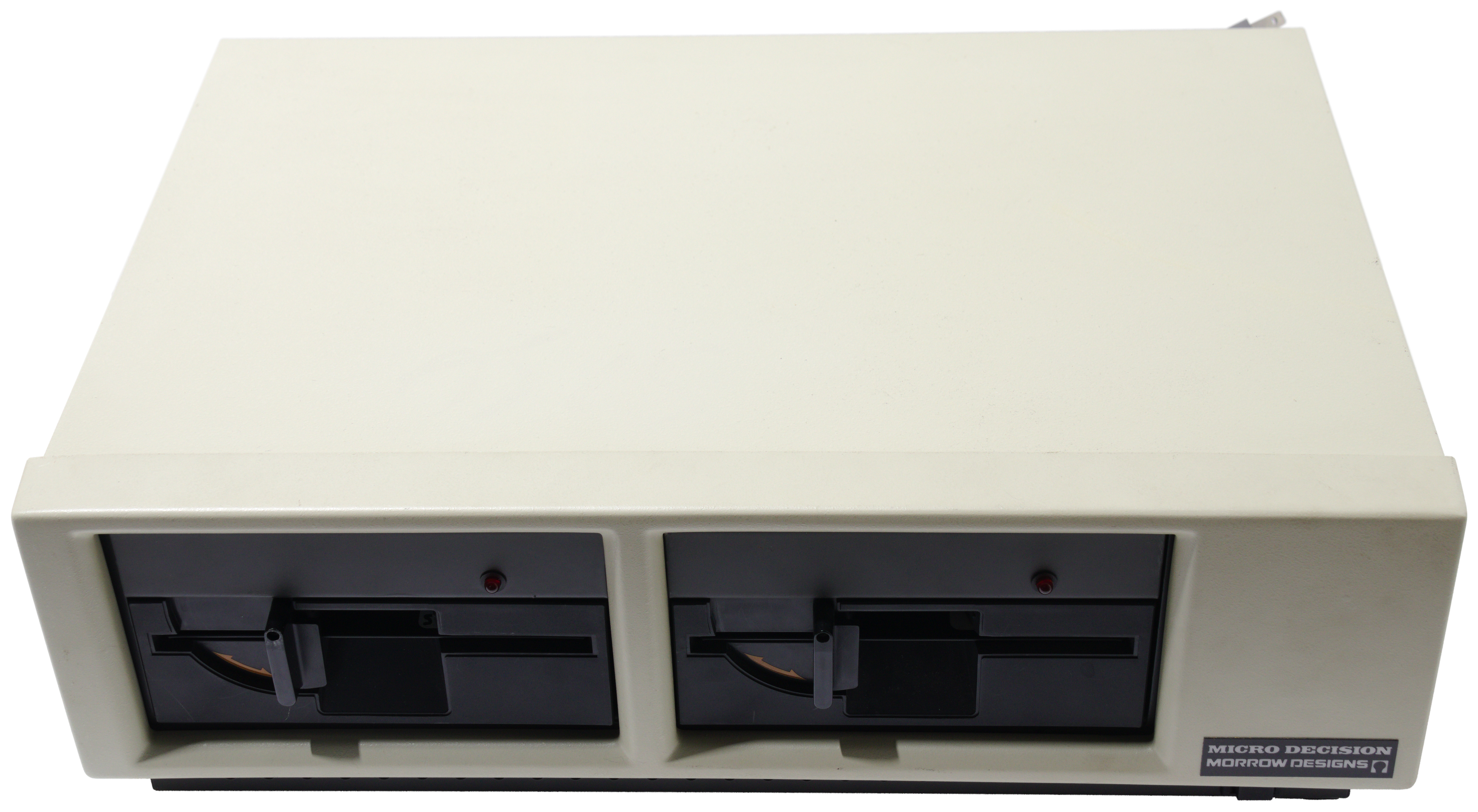
Front view of a Micro Decision MD-2

The Equinox 100, sold through Fullmer's company Parasitic Engineering, was a powerful machine in an attractive cabinet, but failed to attract much attention as it used an 8080 at a time when the Z80 was rapidly taking over. Morrow turned to selling floppy drives for S-100 machines. The package (which proved quite popular) included an 8-inch (20 cm) external drive, controller board, CP/M, and CBASIC. In 1982, he issued the Morrow Micro Decision line, a group of single-board Z80 machines designed to answer the high price of computer hardware. A single-drive 200 kilobyte system sold for under $2000 equipped with a terminal, which placed it squarely in competition with the other CP/M systems, they were respectable business machines with "no sex appeal" but an extensive software bundle, and came in a desktop case like the IBM Displaywriter they were intended to compete against.

The Micro Decision series was introduced in late 1982 and offered with either one or two single-sided three-quarter-height floppy drives, using a 40-track disk format with five 1024-byte sectors per track for an unformatted capacity of about 200 kilobytes. The floppy controller in the Micro Decision was based around the NEC u765 floppy-disk controller (FDC) found in the IBM PC rather than the more common Western Digital 17xx series FDCs. Console I/O was provided by a Lear Siegler ADM-20 terminal. The ADM-20 had graphics capability, but since it lacked any provisions for switching out of graphics mode short of power cycling the terminal, Morrow did not support the use of this feature. Later on, Morrow offered Liberty 50 terminals and officially supported the use of graphics on them. Early Micro Decisions had no Centronics port and used one of two RS-232 ports for connecting the terminal and a printer/modem. DIP switches on the ports to adjust the baud rate required taking the cover off to manipulate. A connector for attaching two external floppy drives was also provided.

Micro Decisions had two major PCB revisions and three case revisions—the version 2.0 PCB was introduced in spring 1983 and added improved data separation circuitry to the floppy controller. The 34-pin external floppy port was changed to a Centronics port and adding a third and fourth floppy drive required putting them on the internal chain inside the case. Early Micro Decisions had a power supply that was inadequate for more than two internal floppy drives; the version 2.0 PCB came with a more substantial PSU that also had a detachable power cord. There were several ROM and CP/M revisions as well; all ROM revisions except the final one were unable to access floppy drive #4 due to a bug. The final ROM revision (v3.1) also incorporated several OS features that had previously been provided on disk. The version 2.0 PCB also included a 40 pin expansion connector on it. An Intel 8253 timer was added to provide more flexible setting of the baud rates on the RS-232 ports. Although on paper, the UART serial controller chip could operate at 19k baud speed, a design flaw in the serial port circuitry prevented the use of speeds greater than 9600 bit/s. At the same time when the version 2.0 PCBs were introduced, Morrow also began offering the MD-3 which had two double-sided, half-height floppy drives for a 400k storage capacity.

The final machine in the MD series was the MD-11, a substantially upgraded machine with 128k of memory, CP/M 3.0, and an optional 10MB hard disk.

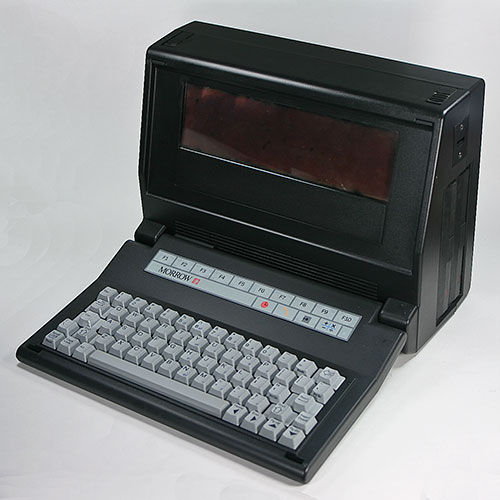
A Morrow Pivot

The CP/M platform was rapidly displaced by the newer (yet very similar) MS-DOS/PC DOS platforms. The 16-bit 8086 architecture of the new machines enabled them to break the 64 KB RAM limit of CP/M and address up to a megabyte of RAM. CP/M's fortunes weren't helped by the user-oriented marketing of Microsoft and IBM and the lack of same by Digital Research.

In 1984, Morrow released its first IBM-compatible computer, a lunchbox portable known as the Morrow Pivot (based on its unique form factor where neither the keyboard nor the monitor folded away from the case). Produced by an outside OEM manufacturer, the same model was licensed by Morrow to Zenith Data Systems, who sold it as the Z-171. In addition to its lower cost and more prominent brand name, Zenith won an extremely profitable contract to sell computers to the US government, after the president of Morrow Designs left to go to work for Zenith. Morrow filed for bankruptcy by the end of the year.

== Later years ==
Following the collapse of his computer businesses, Morrow devoted the rest of his life to his hobby of collecting original 78 RPM jazz and dance records from the 1920s and 1930s. Until his death, he digitally transcribed and restored thousands of recordings using a computer system he developed, reissuing them under his Old Masters label. Morrow died in May 2003 at his home in San Mateo, California, from aplastic anemia.

== See also ==
- Bill Godbout
- Cromemco
- Computer Chronicles
