= Stratos (computer) =

Z80-based microcomputer

- Developer: Symbiotic Systems, Inc.
- Manufacturer: Symbiotic Systems, Inc.
- Type: Microcomputer
- Released: 1981; 45 years ago
- Discontinued: 1983
- Operating system: CP/M 2.0
- CPU: Zilog Z80 at 4 MHz
- Memory: 64 KB conventional RAM, 16 KB programmable RAM, 2 KB EPROM

The Stratos was a Z80-based microcomputer introduced by Symbiotic Systems, Inc., in 1981.

== Background and development ==
The Stratos was designed by Stewart Earnest and Ray McKaig of Symbiotic Systems, Inc., a company originally based out of Woodland, California, and later relocated to Santa Cruz, California. Symbiotic Systems previously released the Syncron 8, a S-100 bus–based computer running the Intel 8080 microprocessor and featuring a backplane motherboard with twenty card slots. The 8080 is housed on a card that features PROMs, one of which has a bootstrap loader allowing the user to load software via floppy disk or data cassette, while the other has a 512-KB PROM flashable by the user. The Syncron 8 can take up to 12 KB of RAM and has a keyboard interface allowing users to directly interact with the computer without the need for a terminal. A television could be used as a display for the computer with the use of a composite cable. The Syncron 8 was regarded as a hobbyist or industrial computer.

== Specifications ==
The Stratos by contrast is a general-purpose, turnkey, single-board computer, built from a six-layer printed circuit board and powered by a Zilog Z80 microprocessor clocked at 4 MHz. The computer comes with 64 KB of conventional RAM and 16 KB of additional RAM, the latter programmable as either disk-cache memory, as conventional memory (as the zero page in CP/M), as video memory, or as a RAM disk. The computer also comes with a 2-KB EPROM. The computer's BIOS chip was custom written by Symbiotic Systems.

The included software package comprises CP/M version 2.2, the Spellbinder word processor, either CBASIC or a Pascal compiler, Reminder, Autophone, a personal financing application, and a medley of bespoke programs. Reminder is a task-scheduling utility that took advantage of the computer's built-in real-time clock to executive certain programs and directives based on a 99-year calendar. Autophone is an auto-dialer/answering utility that can issue DTMF signals or pulses through a telephone line to automatically (and repeatedly, if desired) place phone calls; it can also automatically answer incoming calls if it detects one on the line. One of the Stratos' bespoke programs is Font, a bitmapped font editor that can redefine any of the 256 memory-mapped 8-by-9-matrix characters of the on-screen font to any shape, either with a keyboard or with an optional light pen.

The Stratos was optioned with either one or more 5.25-inch or 8-inch floppy disk drives. It can address up to 5 MB of floppy storage. The computer's power supply unit is switched-mode and was reported to run at 80 percent efficiency in 1981, negating the need for internal fans. The system unit and included keyboard are housed in a teak enclosure. The computer's lack of electromagnetic shielding reportedly made the computer prone to radio-frequency interference.

== Release and reception ==
The Stratos was released in September 1981 for at least $6350; the price was higher depending on the configuration. The computer was previously previewed at the 6th West Coast Computer Faire in June 1981, where Marlin Ouverson, editor of Dr. Dobb's Journal, wrote that its real-time clock and 16 KB of programmable RAM "set it apart from other CP/M compatible systems". The computer saw modest industrial use, with a real estate company in Santa Cruz using it to generate income analysis reports of their clientele, while a book publisher and printing broker out of San Francisco used the Stratos to compose and design brochures. The computer continued to be sold until 1983, when Symbiotic went out of business.
