= Stewart Cheifet =

American television presenter (1938–2025)

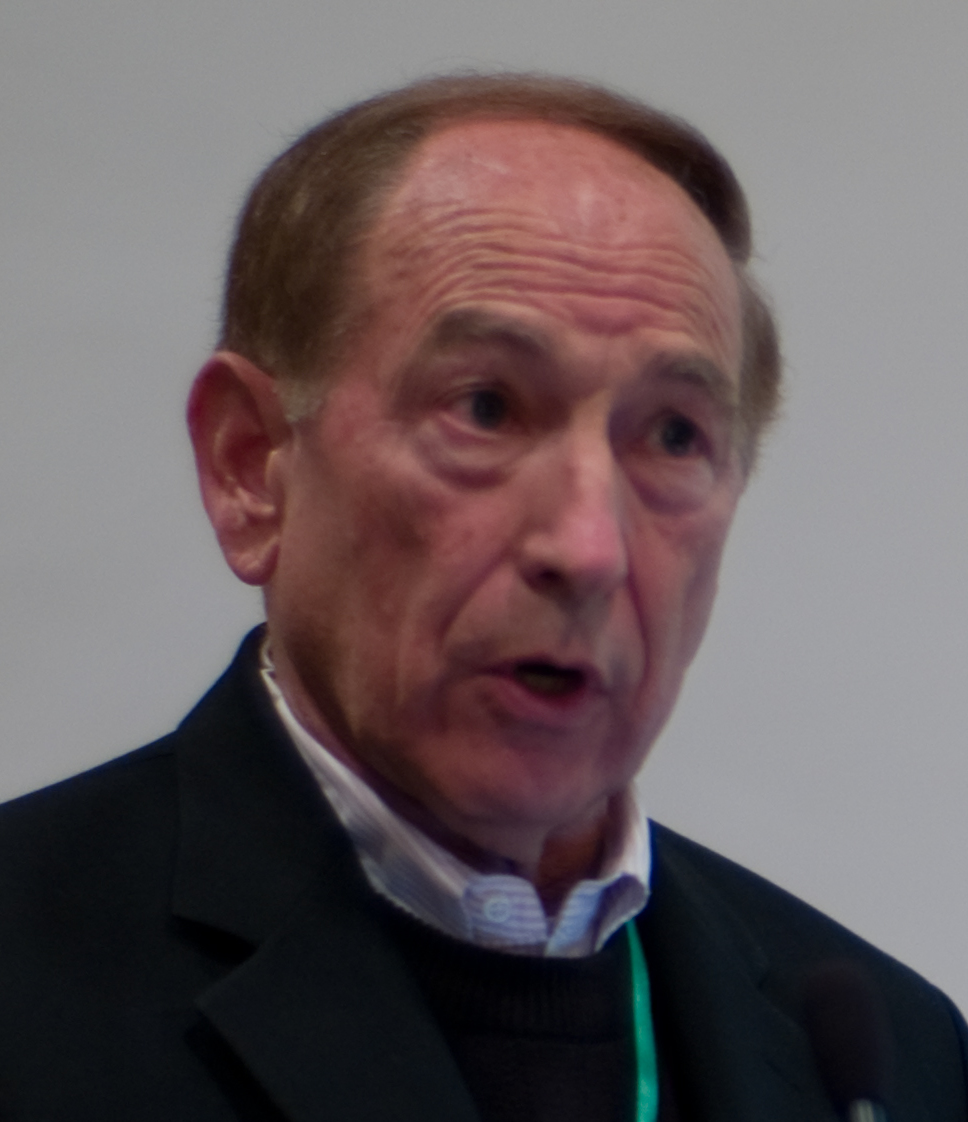
- Cheifet in 2007
- Born: Stewart Douglas Cheifet; September 24, 1938; Philadelphia, Pennsylvania, U.S.
- Died: December 28, 2025 (aged 87); Philadelphia, Pennsylvania, U.S.
- Education: University of Southern California (B.A., Mathematics & Psychology, 1960); Harvard Law School (J.D.)
- Occupations: Television host, producer
- Years active: 1981–2025
- Known for: Computer Chronicles and Net Cafe
- Spouse: Peta Gillian (m. 1967; died 2024)
- Children: 2
- Awards: CPA award for Best Individual Technology Television Program of the year
- Website: cheifet.com at the Wayback Machine (archived 2022-02-18)

Stewart Douglas Cheifet (/ʃɛˈfeɪ/; September 24, 1938 – December 28, 2025) was an American television presenter, best known for his work presenting and producing Computer Chronicles and Net Cafe. He also worked in other reporting positions for PBS and ABC, and others. Raised in Philadelphia, he attended Central High School and graduated from the University of Southern California in 1960 with a degree in Mathematics and Psychology and went on to graduate from Harvard Law School. Cheifet taught broadcast journalism classes at the Donald W. Reynolds School of Journalism at the University of Nevada, Reno.

Cheifet died in Philadelphia, Pennsylvania, on December 28, 2025, at the age of 87, from the flu, according to his daughter.
