= Paul Schindler =

American journalist (born 1952)

- Paul Schindler in 2008
- Born: Paul Eugene Schindler Jr. September 17, 1952 (age 73)
- Education: Massachusetts Institute of Technology (B.S, 1974)
- Occupations: teacher, journalist, TV presenter
- Known for: Computer Chronicles TV show

Paul Eugene Schindler Jr. (born September 17, 1952) is an American journalist known for being the software reviewer on the popular television program Computer Chronicles from 1985 to 1999. He worked for 20 years in computer journalism at CMP Technology and Ziff-Davis, including Computer Systems News, Information Systems News, Information Week, PC Week, Byte Magazine, and Windows Magazine.

A 1974 graduate of MIT, he now lives in the San Francisco Bay Area and was a middle-school history teacher at the Joaquin Moraga Intermediate School in Moraga, California. Paul was also a contestant on Jeopardy! in 1985 as well as five other television game shows.
