= Computer Chronicles =

American PBS TV series on computer technology (1983–2002)

- Logo used during 1989–1995
- Created by: Stewart Cheifet
- Presented by: Gary Kildall; Jim Warren; Stewart Cheifet
- Country of origin: United States
- Original language: English
- No. of episodes: 428 (list of episodes)

Production
- Executive producer: Stewart Cheifet
- Running time: 30 minutes

Original release
- Network: PBS
- Release: February 5, 1984 – June 25, 2002

Computer Chronicles (or The Computer Chronicles from 1984 to 1989) is an American half-hour television series that was broadcast on PBS public television from 1984 to 2002. It documented and explored the personal computer as it grew from its infancy in the early 1980s to its rise in the global market at the turn of the 21st century. Series creator Stewart Cheifet served as main host throughout the show's existence.

Episodes of Computer Chronicles reviewed a variety of home and business computers, including hardware accessories, software and other consumer computing devices and gadgetry. Each episode ended with a news-like segment reporting on new developments and announcements in the computer industry. A wide range of computing topics were showcased and demonstrated, ranging from home use, business, education, gaming, digital music creation and editing, to networking and online telecommunication.

== Production ==
Logo of The Computer Chronicles from 1984 to 1989

The series was created by Stewart Cheifet (later the show's co-host), who was then the station manager of the College of San Mateo's KCSM-TV (now independent non-commercial KPJK). The show was initially broadcast as a local weekly series beginning in 1981. The show was, at various points in its run, produced by KCSM-TV, WITF-TV in Harrisburg, Pennsylvania, and KTEH in San Jose. It became a national series on PBS in 1984, running until 2002, with Cheifet as host. From 1994 to 1997, the show was produced by PCTV, based in New Hampshire in cooperation with KCSM-TV. Starting in the fall of 1997 and continuing to its end, the show was produced by KTEH San Jose and Stewart Cheifet Productions.

== Co-presenters ==
Computer Chronicles had several supporting presenters appearing alongside Cheifet, including:

- Gary Kildall: founder of the software company Digital Research, served as Cheifet's co-host from 1984 to 1990 (with last appearances in Season 8 episodes Windows 3.0 and Hypertext) providing insights and commentary on products, as well as discussions on the future of the ever-expanding personal computer sphere. After Kildall left the show, Cheifet served as the solo host. Killdall died in 1994, and the show paid tribute to him in a special episode.
- George Morrow: presenter, commentator and occasional co-host, who for a time headed the Morrow Design company. Morrow appeared on Chronicles from 1985 to 1988 (Seasons 3 to 5) with a one-off appearance in 1995 on the episode Mobile Computing. Morrow died in 2003.
- Paul Schindler: featured predominantly in software reviews, Schindler contributed to the series regularly from 1984 to 1993 (Season 10) with sporadic appearances thereafter until 1999.
- Tim Bajarin: author and columnist who appeared as a co-host and contributor regularly from 1990 until 1995 (Seasons 8 to 13) and occasionally thereafter until 2001.
- Wendy Woods: appearing from 1985 until 1989 (Seasons 2 to 7), Woods provided reports for many software and hardware products, as well as talking with the main presenters in the studio about specific topics.
- Jan Lewis: former president of the Palo Alto Research Group (not to be confused with Xerox PARC), served as a co-host and interviewee from 1985 until 1991 (Seasons 3 to 9).
- Herb Lechner: with SRI International, served as both co-host and interviewee in some of the earliest episodes in Season 1, with a final one-off appearance in 1986 in the episode Artificial Intelligence.

== Format ==
The Computer Chronicles format remained relatively unchanged throughout its run, except perhaps with the noticeable difference in presenting style; originally formal, with Cheifet and the guests wearing business suits (with neckties) customary in the professional workplace in the early 1980s, it evolved into a more relaxed, casual style beginning with Season 11 in 1993, with Cheifet and guests adopting the "business casual" style of dress that the Silicon Valley computer industry arguably helped pioneer.

The theme tune from 1984 to 1989 was "Byte by Byte" by Craig Palmer for the Network Music Library. Beginning with Season 7 in 1989, the opening graphics were changed, the show was renamed "Computer Chronicles" (omitting the definite article), and a new song was chosen, "Zenith," composed for OmniMusic by John Manchester, which would run until the show's end. The graphics were redesigned again in 1995, with the "Web page" graphics designed by Giles Bateman, and redesigned again in 1998 to show clips from the show in a "multiple window" format.

Beginning in 1984, the last five minutes or so featured Random Access, a segment that gave the viewer the latest computer news from the home and business markets. This was hosted initially by Stewart Cheifet himself then later by other anchors: Cynthia Steele, Maria Gabriel, Janelle Stelson, Jonell Patterson, Laurie Anderson, and various other individuals. Random Access was discontinued in 1997.

The Online Minute, introduced in 1995 and lasting until 1997, gave the viewers certain Web sites that dealt with the episode's topic. It featured Giles Bateman, who designed the show's "Web page" opening sequence that was used from that period up until the show's end. Another feature on the show during this time period was Stewart's "Pick of the Week", in which he detailed a popular piece of software or gadget on the market that appealed to him and might appeal to the home audience.

== Availability ==
The show ended its run in 2002. Almost all episodes of Computer Chronicles have been made available for free download at the Internet Archive. There is also an unofficial YouTube channel with episodes. Many episodes of the show have been dubbed into other languages, including Arabic, French and Spanish.

== See also ==
- Net Cafe, de facto spin-off of Computer Chronicles, co-hosted by Cheifet, that aired from 1996 to 2002
- WDR Computerclub, a similar show on German TV
