= Whole Earth Review =

American magazine (1985–2002)

Whole Earth
- Former editors: Kevin Kelly, Howard Rheingold, Ruth Kissane, Peter Warshall, Anne Herbert
- Categories: Environment, Science, Politics
- Frequency: Quarterly
- First issue: January 1985
- Final issue Number: Spring 2003; Issue 110
- Company: Point Foundation
- Country: United States
- Based in: Sausalito, California
- Language: English
- Website: http://www.wholeearth.com
- ISSN: 1097-5268

Whole Earth Review (Whole Earth after 1997) was a magazine which was founded in January 1985 after the merger of the Whole Earth Software Review (a supplement to the Whole Earth Software Catalog) and the CoEvolution Quarterly. All of these periodicals are descendants of Stewart Brand's Whole Earth Catalog. The earlier ones were published by Dick Raymond’s Portola Institute, while later ones were published by the Point Foundation, a non-profit founded by Raymond and Brand.

The last published hard copy issue of the magazine was the Winter 2002 issue. The next issue (Spring 2003) was planned but never published in hard copy format. Bruce Sterling attempted to solicit funds for this issue by writing that "friends at Whole Earth Magazine have experienced a funding crunch so severe that the Spring 2003 special issue (#111) on Technological Singularity, edited by Alex Steffen of the Viridian curia, hasn't been printed and distributed. Whole Earth is soliciting donations to get the issue printed, and has put some of the content online". Eventually, elements of the 2003 issue appeared only in digital format on the Whole Earth website.

== Overview ==
Fred Turner discusses the creation of the Whole Earth Review in From Counterculture to Cyberculture: Stewart Brand, the Whole Earth Network, and the Rise of Digital Utopianism. Turner notes that in 1983, The Whole Earth Software Catalog was proposed by John Brockman as a magazine which "would do for computing what the original [Whole Earth Catalog] had done for the counterculture: identify and recommend the best tools as they emerged". The first issue was released in the Fall of 1984. The Whole Earth Software Catalog was a business failure, and was only published twice, with only three of The Whole Earth Software Review supplements published . At the same time, another Brand publication, CoEvolution Quarterly evolved out of the original Whole Earth Supplement in 1974. In 1985, Brand merged CoEvolution Quarterly with The Whole Earth Software Review to create the Whole Earth Review.

This is also indicated in the issues themselves. Fall 1984, issue #43 is titled The Last CoEvolution Quarterly. The cover also states, "Next issue is 'Whole Earth Review': livelier snake, new skin". In January 1985, issue #44 was titled Whole Earth Review: Tools and Ideas for the Computer Age. The cover also reads "The continuation of CoEvolution Quarterly and Whole Earth Software Review". In an article titled "Whole Earth Software Catalog Version 1.1", Stewart Brand states that there are three intended audiences for the new Whole Earth Review: a) The audience of The Whole Earth Software Catalog, b) The audience of The Whole Earth Software Review and c) The audience of CoEvolution Quarterly. The office of Whole Earth Review was next door to The WELL, another project that Stewart Brand and associates co-founded.

Whole Earth had a special role in promoting alternative technology or appropriate technology. In deciding to publish full-length articles on specific topics in natural sciences, invention, arts, etc., Whole Earth (like its predecessor, CoEvolution Quarterly) was a journal aimed primarily at the educated layperson. The industrial designer and educator J. Baldwin served as the technology editor. Tool and book reviews were in abundance, and ecological and technology topics were interspersed with articles treating social and community subjects. One of the journal's recurring themes was "the commons" (a thing, institution or geographic space of, or having to do with, the community as a whole), and the related "tragedy of the commons".

Stewart Brand and the later editors invited reviews of books and tools from experts in specific fields, to be approached as though they were writing a letter to a friend.

Whole Earth editors Kevin Kelly and Howard Rheingold both went on to edit other magazines.
