= Michael Phillips (consultant) =

Michael Phillips (born 1938) is a published author of eleven books. As a banker, he was the key organizer of Mastercard. Phillips was the first president of the Point Foundation; Point was created with money from the Whole Earth Catalog. Writing for the CoEvolution Quarterly, in 1976 he was the first person to suggest random selection of legislators and co-authored the first book on the subject in 1985. Phillips has been an expert witness in more than a dozen public utility cases on behalf of major American minority organizations.

From 1988 to 1998 Phillips produced and hosted the national public radio program Social Thought. He is also a pro-business blogger.

== Career ==
Considering Phillips' quite unconventional professional gamut, by 1976 an introductory note to one of his articles contributed to the CoEvolution Quarterly described him as a "[a] "multi-directional gadfly, innovator, [and] author".

In the 1960s, Phillips was a Bank of California vice-president. He was the primary organizer of Mastercard in 1967. Phillips’s undertakings extended into roles as a consultant, commerce theorist, business mentor, and writer of articles and books. His far-ranging interests went beyond concept into practical action, and he became a board member of various innovative nonprofits.

Phillips was a supporter and officer of the Glide Memorial Church in San Francisco. In the early 1930s, the Church was founded at the corner of Ellis and Taylor streets, by Methodist philanthropist Lizzie Glide; it originally conformed to a conventional Protestant format. By the ‘60s, Glide Memorial Church was distinctly transformed into an “inclusion hub” — a meeting place for personal support, discussion, events, and social programs open to all, expressly serving disadvantaged residents in the city’s neediest neighborhood. Phillips served as the Church's treasurer for a time.

Phillips was a friend of urban planner turned social entrepreneur Dick Raymond. When, between 1971 and '72, Raymond and Stewart Brand organized the nonprofit POINT Foundation, Phillips became the board's first president. The overall task was to provide grants from the astonishing profits of The Last Whole Earth Catalog, published on 1971 (and bestowed on it, in 1972, a National Book Award).

In 1973 Raymond conceived of the idea of a mentoring and support network for small-scale business start-ups in San Francisco. Phillips became the lead organizer of this Briarpatch Network. Phillips and others offered free business mentorship and encouraged mutual aid among members; Phillips became the Briarpatch Network's first president.

Another of Phillips' projects was organizing a daily tourist bus operated under the auspices of the Glide Memorial Church. This initiative brought visitors directly into San Francisco's diverse cultural and ethnic neighborhoods — including Black, Latino, Chinese, Japanese, and LGBTQ+ communities.

== Commerce and "Clientry" ==
Phillips described himself as essentially "pro commerce". His prime personal interest came to be a level of commerce that is situated between simple "trade" and "institutional/corporate commerce". In these classifications, trade the involves the direct, transactional buying and selling of physical goods, commodities, and simple assets. Institutional/corporate commerce involves a massive, automated, network-driven global infrastructure. It is exemplified by corporate supply chains, standardized retail giants, and global financial networks.

As a banker who led the organizing of the Mastercard system, Phillips had an in-depth familiarity with the institutional/corporate level. But his personal interests lay in the areas of community, social inclusiveness, and environmental stewardship. He coined the term Clientry. This level of commerce is distinguished from simple, traditional trade, the focal point has shifted from a physical commodity to a long-term relationship. Phillips noted that, historically, it was anchored by professionals like doctors, lawyers, accountants, or specialized tradespeople. Clientry, he thought, requires a continuous commitment, localized knowledge, and a high degree of subjective trust between the practitioner or purveyor and the client.

Phillips' involvement with the Briarpatch Network was congruent with his values. The network supported people new to entrepreneurship, facilitated their meeting and support of one another, and provided mentorship from those with deep experience in business. In 1982 Phillips and some associates founded the Noren Institute as a business-education project, with meetings held in San Francisco's Potrero Hill neighborhood.

== Books ==
- The Seven Laws of Money, Random House, 1974
- Marketing Without Advertising, Nolo Press 1984
- Honest Business, Random House 1982
- Commerce, Clear Glass Press, 2000
- Simple Living Investments, Clear Glass Publishing, 1982
