= Richard Raymond (publisher) =

American publisher, entrepreneur, and environmentalist (1923–2015)

Richard Harrington Raymond
- Richard "Dick" Raymond, c. 1968
- Born: November 30, 1923; Newark, Ohio, U.S.
- Died: September 16, 2015 (aged 91); Lake Oswego, Oregon, U.S.
- Other name: Dick Raymond
- Education: Miami University, Harvard University
- Occupations: Entrepreneur; publisher; urban planner
- Organizations: Portola Institute; POINT Foundation; Briarpatch Network
- Known for: Mentoring; supporting options in education; publishing; founding organizations
- Notable work: Whole Earth Catalog; CoEvolution Quarterly
- Board member of: POINT Foundation
- Spouses: Ann Meilstrup; Carole Hughes

Richard Harrington Raymond (November 30, 1923 – September 16, 2015), entrepreneur, publisher, and organizer, was a key figure in Northern California environmental and cultural developments. Raymond and a number of his Bay Area associates were early in being keen about digital technology's potential to facilitate personal and group knowledge acquisition, insight, and initiative.

After his employment as an economist and land-use planner in the Stanford Research Institute in the early to mid-1960s, Raymond supported numerous ventures through the Portola Institute, a non-profit organization that he founded and presided over. His Institute supported developments in digital tech and personal-computer applications, explored potentials of computers in educational contexts, and published the Whole Earth Catalog. The WEC's 1971 edition met an unanticipated nationwide success; it not only sold over a million copies, but has been the only catalogue to receive a National Book Award, bestowed the following year in recognition of its readership, and also its unique concept and scope.

Raymond later co-founded the POINT Foundation to financially support the organization of environment- and community-related projects. The Foundation's many undertakings included sending Bay Area environmentalists to the 1972 United Nations Conference on the Human Environment, in Stockholm, as well as supporting the founding of the Trust for Public Land. POINT also published the CoEvolution Quarterly which, a decade later, was expanded in scope as the Whole Earth Review.

The Briarpatch Network — a mentoring and mutual-aid system to support small-scale entrepreneurs — was a brainchild of Raymond's, launched in collaboration with a few of his friends.

In the 1980s and later, he worked in planning in the Pacific Northwest and leadership training in California’s corporate world.

== Early life and education ==
Raymond was born in Newark, Ohio, in 1923. His father worked for the U.S. Department of Agriculture. While growing up, he moved with his parents through the Midwest. He graduated from Miami University and served in the U.S. Navy Air Corps during World War Two. Following the war, he earned an MBA from Harvard Business School.

== Early career ==
Generally known as Dick Raymond, while living in the Portland, Oregon area he gained experience in some start-up companies, which included his co-founding of Rayturn Machine, developer of the IrriGage irrigation-water testing device." Moving to the San Francisco Bay Area in the 1960s, he worked in urban planning at the Stanford Research Institute (SRI), in Menlo Park, California where his specialties included land use, recreational economics, and community development. At SRI, collaborating with strategic planner William S. Royce, one of Raymond's clients was the Century 21 Exposition (the 1962 Seattle World's Fair); Raymond convinced the organizers to plan buildings that would remain on the site as part of the city's heritage. While employed at SRI, among the colleagues he became close friends with was chemist Roger S. Stringham, who decades later became deeply involved with independent experimentation in 'low energy nuclear research' or LENR.

During his years with SRI, Raymond worked as a consultant to the Warm Springs Indian Reservation. At Stanford, he met Stewart Brand a man in his mid twenties who was, at that time, an aspiring photographer and journalist. In 1963, Raymond was able to offer Brand a photography job on the reservation.

Also during his time with SRI, Raymond had worked with the Menlo Park-based nonprofit Dumbarton Research Council, an organization supporting independent scholars, education, and early land conservation campaigns. Raymond's professional life began a venturesome new chapter when he became committed to launching a nonprofit company; it's beginning, under the name Portola Institute, coincided with his departure from SRI in 1966. But overlapping with the ensuing shift, he led research into recreational-economic opportunities, under the authorship and publishing umbrella Richard Raymond Associates; the results surfaced as book-length reports, concentrating on the San Mateo County coastside (published 1967) and the Monterey Area (published 1969).

Under Raymond's direction, Portola published all the early editions of Whole Earth Catalog

== Portola Institute ==
Raymond had become enthusiastic about emerging possibilities in alternative education. Upon leaving SRI, he used his own funds and established the Portola Institute specifically to explore and support education projects." The Institute's office was located on Merrill Street, in Menlo Park.

Psychologist J. Richard Suchman, an associate professor at the University of Illinois, had done research on fostering investigation and critical thinking among elementary-school students. In line with Portola's objectives, during the late 1960s and early ’70s Suchman was an associate of the Institute. He organized the Ortega Park Teachers Laboratory,, which Portola funded.

By 1967 Raymond believed that computers could contribute a valuable ingredient to education, even though personal computing (microcomputer) equipment was at that time known to few people. Computer-application pioneer and author Robert Albrecht worked for a time with Portola, starting a "computer education division." Looking back a half-century, a 2018 article in The New Yorker described the Institute as "a gathering place and incubator of sorts for computer researchers, academics, career engineers, hobbyists, and members of the counterculture."

Close by Portola’s location was the Stanford Research Institute’s Augmentation Research Center, where engineer Douglas Engelbart, inventor of the computer mouse, was employed. Due to the activities of Portola teammates Bob Albrecht and Stewart Brand, links developed between Portola and Engelbart’s projects .

University of Nevada history professor Andrew Kirk wrote that "The Portola Institute was one of the best examples of how creative communities were coalescing around a loose set of shared social and cultural goals in an effort to create new means for achieving personal and community success."

In Portola's early years, Stewart Brand conceived of something he thought of as an "access catalogue" to help people locate useful information and tools to facilitate translation of their ideas into reality. Raymond provided mentoring and connected Brand with other local advisors. With Brand investing some of his own money, supplemented by backing from Portola, a trial 64-page issue of the Whole Earth Catalog (WEC) was produced in 1968. PBS's "American Masters" series called the publication of the WEC a milestone in the history of environmentalism.

A Cornell University online publication, in 2025, declared the "Whole Earth Catalog captured the spirit of America's first Earth Day celebration" — while preceding the inauguration of that globally recognized observance by nearly two years.

The author of a 1972 future-of-education policy paper from the Syracuse University Research Corporation understood, and valued, the Portola Institute’s praxis as being "based on the premise of learning for survival in a chaotic world".

In the mid-1970s, Dick Raymond expressed the idea that "wealth" had two aspects: the physical (the credit system, measured in money) and the non-physical (consisting of people, information, and ideas). He viewed the non-physical as having to do with problem solving. He felt this interpretation accorded with some writings recently published by economist Robert Theobald. Raymond was more concerned with the private sector than with governmental policies and programs; he espoused the idea that modern times called for American individuals to consider putting a little more weight on giving (in terms of the non-physical aspect of wealth) as compared with getting (or, as Raymond termed it, money-mindedness).

Portola's location provided space for the Media Access Center, which offered workshops and classes in the use of video technology. Among other projects Raymond supported via the Portola Institute were the Homebrew Computer Club, and the Integral Urban House. An article in the New York Times, opined that Raymond's Portola Institute "was Silicon Valley's first true incubator."

Portola also published Richard Merrill and Thomas Gage's technical Energy Primer: Solar, Water, Wind, and Biofuels, considered, for its time (1974), a fairly comprehensive introduction; Portola (in cooperation with the New York City-based Delta) published a second edition four years later.

The WECs, published through nearly three decades, spawned a number of descendants and permutations, often involving editors who'd had first-hand experience with the Catalogs; these publications included the Whole Earth Ecolog (1990) and the Electronic Whole Earth Catalog (1989, a CD Rom version, utilizing hypertext).

== POINT Foundation ==
The first large (448-page) edition of the Whole Earth Catalog was published in late 1971 with an arrangement between Portola and Random House, enabling an extremely wide circulation. This edition won acclaim the following year, when it received the 1972 National Book Award for Contemporary Affairs. The WEC's remarkable financial success ensuing from this point enabled Raymond and Stewart Brand to found the POINT Foundation. purposed with providing grants for promising ventures. One among the very many academic papers exploring the emergence of environmentalism mentions this: "Public concern over toxic contamination of our air, water, land and food and the startling loss of natural beauty and resources to development rose sharply in the 1960s and 1970s." Raymond and Brand were among those whose concerns aligned with this values-based public concern, rooted substantially in ecological science, and, in certain ways, they pioneered aspects of endeavors based on it. Raymond expressed a personal "premise" that "It's more rewarding to ask good questions than to acquire a collection of everybody's answers" — one of his guiding principles.

Raymond and Brand invited a group of board members with varied viewpoints but united by concern for the natural environment. Michael Phillips served as POINT's first president, and early board members included Bill English and Huey Johnson. Paul Hawken, who became successful as a futurist and one of the best known American writers on the subject of environment and business, spent two decades as an advisor or a member of the board. Phillips and Raymond brought their experience-based creative ideas around social capital with them.

In 1972, one of POINT's first large grants enabled a group of environmental scientists, activists, and Native Americans to attend the United Nations Conference on the Human Environment in Stockholm. Huey Johnson, a POINT board member who was enabled to attend the Stockholm Conference, was influenced by his time with the foundation to found a new park-creation and land-conservation advocacy organization, the Trust for Public Land. POINT funded him toward this objective subsequent to his serving on the board for two years. The Trust's projects took root nationwide. Other early POINT grant recipients included Steve Baer's solar-technology Zomeworks, the Western Montana Scientists’ Committee for Public Information (spreading awareness about air pollution and pesticides) and the research center for agriculture, aquaculture, and bioshelter headed by John Todd and Bill McLarney, on Cape Cod.

Portola Institute transferred the publishing of WECs to POINT in 1974. Among varied other projects, POINT published the eclectic CoEvolution Quarterly (CQ) starting in 1974, and Soft Technology (a 1978 book edited by James T. Baldwin and Stewart Brand). Conservation biologist Peter Warshall served as CQ's science and land-use editor. The POINT publications CoEvolution Quarterly and the Whole Earth Software Review, were merged in 1985, creating a new POINT offering, the Whole Earth Review.

Also in 1985 POINT launched The WELL, an early online discussion community. It represented an advance over the solely text-based Usenet that had been established in 1980; though launching during the dial-up era, The WELL displayed the capacity to enable threaded conversations, to quickly integrate into the World Wide Web, and to otherwise attentively revamp over time.

== Briarpatch Network ==
Michael Phillips, a friend of Raymond's, was a Bank of California vice-president, and had been the organizer of Mastercard. When Raymond came up with the "Briarpatch" concept in 1973, Phillips worked with him to assist small business; together they co-founded the Briarpatch Network, which opened a Bay Area office at San Francisco's Pier 40 in 1974. The network functioned as a consulting and mutual-support organization providing free or low-cost services to small-scale entrepreneurs. Warren Johnson, Chair of the Geography Department at San Diego State University, deemed the network an exemplary means of aiding people who expect their work to accord with their interests and passion, and referred to the Bay Area's Briarpatch as "group of small, independent entrepreneurs doing what they want." For some owner-operators, this could afford the option for flextime work.

According to Phillips and co-author Greta Alexander, "The outwardly visible characteristic of the people who run Briarpatch businesses is that most are under 45 years old, [and] there is a high proportion of women owners."

"Briarpatch makes its members keenly aware of their relationship to each other and the community. This is why it is referred to as a network rather than a group of people pursuing separate interests", as Hal Richman reported in The Sun magazine. Individual business operators' own experiences turned up practical insights and ideas; the publication of the network's Skill-Exchange Newsletter, listing resources and skills members were willing to share with one another at no charge, enabled a cross-fertilization. A 1978 study of innovative workplaces in the Bay Area found the Briaratch Network to be exceptional in numerous respects, one of which was that it enabled members to avail themselves of a health plan, if they so wished. Tallied in 1983, the Network's records listed over a thousand people who had been members. Prior to people typically owning digital devices, access for member-to-member information sharing, as well as advisor-to-member counselling, was generally face-to-face. In recent years, contact and information transfer within the Network has relied considerably on internet options.

Individual experience sharing and mentoring were key aspects. However, in one of its facets (sparked off by Phillips, Fran Peavey, and others), the Briarpatch network developed an explicit adult-education dimension, focused specifically on practical applications within numerous fields, as widely varied as entrepreneurship, social and environmental activism, and even owner-builder home construction. Various links were made with mainstream education institutions, and some new institutions were founded, as well.

== Later life and death ==
In 1979, Raymond, his second wife, Carole Hughes, and their two children relocated to the Portland area. The move was occasioned by Dick becoming involved in a solar-energy development project. However, this solar-power work came to an end when the federal government withdrew financial support for solar in the early '80s. Raymond then devoted himself to business consulting and, among other projects, became involved in large-scale leadership trainings for corporations such as Hewlett-Packard and Pacific Bell, advised on economic development in Sri Lanka, and (in the early 2000s) served as the representative of the Inland Light Rail Association in Spokane's light-rail transit planning. He also engaged with projects related to unmanned flight, and low energy nuclear reactions, or LENR.

Raymond's helping hand to his home community included his serving on the board of the Lake Oswego Public Library.

In 2004, he donated the Portola Institute and POINT Foundation files (correspondence, board materials, and project reports) to Special Collections in the Stanford University Libraries.

Dick Raymond died at age 91, on September 16, 2015 at Lake Oswego, Oregon.

== Legacy ==
In 1988, Lloyd Kahn, designer, hands-on builder, and instructor-turned publisher (Shelter Publications), proclaimed his insider's view of how Portola’s Whole Earth Catalog, securing a publishing deal with Random House (in NYC), provided a cross-U.S. boost to West Coast publishing. Kahn had served as the Shelter editor with the WEC, and utilized the WEC’s equipment (and distribution affiliation) to create and publish his first two books, at which point his company was off and running. In Kahn’s view, this paved the way for scores of other West Coast independents. Kahn's company is still active as of 2026.

The Portola/POINT Whole Earth Catalog presented a model widely copied and adapted in North America and beyond, as well. In France, for example, Le Catalogue des Ressources appeared during the mid to late ’70s; it adapted the WEC’s scope, and was published in four volumes. Le Catalogue's topic areas included food, clothing, housing, construction processes, transportation, education, health, and media.

During their youth, personal-computer pioneers and Apple Inc co-founders Steve Jobs and Steve Wozniak were both members of the Homebrew Computer Club. which Portola Institute encouraged and gave some funding to. Jobs much later imparted in his Stanford University Commencement address in 2005: "When I was young, there was an amazing publication called the Whole Earth Catalog, which was one of the bibles of my generation. It was created ... in the late 1960s, before personal computers and desktop publishing, so it was all made with typewriters, scissors and Polaroid cameras. It was sort of like Google in paperback form, 35 years before Google came along: it was idealistic, and overflowing with neat tools and great notions."

In Northern California during the 1970s, the original Briarpatch Network (as founded by Dick Raymond and Michael Phillips) spun off several similar small-business support groups in different communities, using the Briarpatch tag. Briarpatch members started to take advantage of the Internet as it began to emerge into popular usage. Claude Whitmyer, becoming the third coordinator of the original (San Francisco-based) Briarpatch branch in the 1980s, has been keeping it organized and active through the years.

As one of the Internet's initial open-membership conferencing systems, the Whole Earth 'Lectronic Link (the WELL) — founded in 1985 by POINT — persists to the present, and thus has enjoyed a rare longevity. The WELL's policy is that, when posting, members are required to use their actual name (not a pseudonym), and that "you own your own words," meaning a member is legally responsible for what he or she posts; these both serve to foster accountability. Briarpatch members were among the first to make use of benefits the WELL offered. Briarpatch coordinator Claude Whitmyer, for example, was one of the earliest members of the WELL.

The WELL and its success provided a model which led to various spinoffs. In locations like Austin, Texas people started very similar membership conferencing systems platformed by software named Yap.
