= We Are As Gods =

We Are As Gods may refer to:

- We Are As Gods (film), a 2021 documentary film
- We Are As Gods (book), a 2016 nonfiction book by Kate Daloz
