= Huey Johnson =

American environmentalist (1933–2020)

- Born: January 6, 1933 central Michigan, US
- Died: July 12, 2020 (aged 87); Corte Madera, California, US
- Education: Western Michigan University, Utah State University
- Occupations: Environmentalist; Organizer; California State Cabinet position, 1977–82
- Organizations: Trust for Public Land, Resource Renewal Institute, Grand Canyon Trust
- Known for: Founding large organizations
- Board member of: POINT Foundation, Resource Renewal Institute
- Awards: Pugsley Medal, U.N. Sasakawa Prize

Huey Johnson (January 6, 1933 – July 12, 2020) was an American environmentalist, noted as a prolific organizer of non-governmental organizations. Johnson served for several years as the appointed director (Secretary) of the California Natural Resources Agency. He was also a vocal advocate of Green Plans, and worked to put them in place in the U.S. and abroad.

Among other organizations, Johnson founded the Trust for Public Land and the Resource Renewal Institute (RRI), a non-profit organization that deals with environmental sustainability.

== Early life, education, and early career ==
Johnson was born in central Michigan near the Battle Creek River. At age nine, Johnson moved with his family to Lansing, where his father had secured a job in the management of a General Motors assembly plant. Huey was able to spend a lot of time outdoors. His mother acquainted him with wildflowers, trees, Wordsworth's poetry, and the local Carnegie Library. One year, he enjoyed the Michigan United Conservation Clubs’ “summer conservation camp”.

Johnson earned a B.A. in biology at Western Michigan University, and an M.S. in Wildlife Management at Utah State University. His work in relation to land and resources matters developed out of his knowledge of both the history of environmental impacts within the U.S. and the millennia-long histories of environmental impacts on societies worldwide.

He worked in a travelling sales position for Union Carbide, based first in San Francisco and later in Denver. Leaving that job, he settled in the Bay Area making his long-term home in Mill Valley. He worked as a seasonal biologist for the California Department of Fish and Game, and afterwards for the Alaska Department of Fish and Game.

== Career as an environmentalist ==
Looking back from the late 1980s, Johnson made a public statement about how his personal convictions and commitment led to his vocation. "My preference is to look to the future in 100 year segments... I decided to be an environmentalist full time and became a preserver of unique land."

In 1963, he became the western states representative for the Nature Conservancy. Among his pursuits in this role, Huey was a leader in the end-game of a protracted legal and plebiscite struggle to secure a piece of natural Northern California coast land planned for industrial/residential development, the Marincello Trail in the Marin Headlands; he closed the deal that preserved it as natural heritage. Huey became the first Western Regional Director of the Conservancy when that position was created in 1968, serving in the role through 1972.

Some years later, Johnson connected with environmentalists in the Bay Area circles of Dick Raymond and Stewart Brand; Raymond and Brand had established the POINT Foundation. The Foundation sponsored a group of environmentalists, including Huey, to attend the United Nations Conference on the Human Environment in Stockholm, in 1972. After serving for two years on the Foundation's board, in 1973 Johnson developed the idea for the Trust for Public Land. Upon leaving the board, the Foundation provided Johnson some initial funds toward establishing the Trust.

The attitude Johnson developed with these successes qualified him to later advise others, “you have to persist, you have to believe in yourself when everybody else says it won’t work."

The first focus of the Trust was on urban and suburban parks, then on agricultural land. One of Huey's early significant accomplishments via the Trust, involving considerable struggle, was the establishment of the Golden Gate National Recreation Area. In this endeavor he was aided by lawyer and environmentalist Martin J. Rosen, who became a member of the Trust's board of directors. As of early 2025, the Trust had created 5,504 outdoor spaces, and protected 4-million acres in the U.S.

Huey also founded the Grand Canyon Trust and the Environmental Liaison Center, in Nairobi.

Johnson had a far-reaching public role during the late 1970s and early '80s, heading the California Natural Resources Agency (CNRA), having been appointed Secretary with the approval of the California State Senate during Jerry Brown's first administration. Johnson served from 1977 to 1982. In Sacramento he was known for starting his day with a vigorous bicycle ride to work. According to Rich Hammond, Under Secretary of the CNRA at the start of Johnson's tenure, Huey completely reorganized and invigorated the Agency's activities. One fundamental aspect was Johnson's insistence that key officials under the direction of his agency educate themselves in the fundamentals of scientific and applied ecology and their practical applications to the world. He told them to read the writings of ecologists Eugene and Howard Odum, also A Sand County Almanac, and Raymond F. Dasmann’s Destruction of California. Johnson also provided opportunities for bright, capable people from underprivileged backgrounds to be employed in his office, and simultaneously work toward a graduate degree.

Illustrating one specific accomplishment during his tenure, Johnson wrote: "We saved 1,200 miles of California rivers with an environmental impact statement. We used it to pass the Wild Rivers Act. See, both the federal government and the state of California had passed the bill, but for it to become law someone had to marry the two. All of California's water interests were doing everything they could to make sure it didn't happen... But I had this black gal in my office named Vera Marcus. She was tough, always walking up to me saying, 'Hey, white boy, why don't you challenge me?' So I gave her the Wild Rivers project. She did the impossible: She got an environmental impact statement done in four months. That's two years' worth of work. Signing the Wild Rivers Act into law was the very last thing that the Carter Administration did in office."

A government resource-related regulatory position will always occasion some adversarial responses to policy. Johnson believed in building relationships. He publicly explained that, during his tenure, he valued opportunities to socialize informally with those who objected to parameters he put forward.

Johnson's tenure was responsible for the state's "Investing in Prosperity" resource-conservation program, which laid out concepts and plans for sustainable forests, water courses, fisheries and soil. His accomplishments in the CNRA position influenced Stewart Brand to turn a corner from bohemian disaffection with government to acceptance that committed, competent governance could have a role in protection and restoration of the environment.

Johnson eventually became the president of the Nature Conservancy. He was known for introducing Green Plans, an integrated approach to protecting and managing natural resources, to the United States. He had travelled to Norway in the late 1980s where he developed a keen interest in green plans; the Norwegians told him he’d do better to study what had been accomplished with these in the Netherlands. Green plans, which have been implemented in the Netherlands, New Zealand, Sweden, and Mexico City, provide useful working models to help countries plan for a more sustainable future. Johnson founded the Resource Renewal Institute, in 1983, whose role is advocating for strategies for attaining environmental sustainability.

By the 1990s, Johnson was publicly expressing concern for atmospheric CO_{2} levels and global climate change. He believed that green plans could contribute to managing climate change.

In 2001, the United Nations Environmental Programme awarded Johnson the $200,000 Sasakawa Prize, considered one of the world's most important environmental awards. As well, Johnson's work in resource management has been praised by United Nations officials for having a global perspective. The United Nations has called Johnson "a catalyst and champion for environmental protection”.

== Death ==
Johnson died on July 12, 2020, at the age of 87.

== See also ==
- Green Plans
- Singapore Green Plan 2012
- The Trust for Public Land
- United Nations Environmental Programme
