= Point Foundation =

Point Foundation may refer to:

- Point Foundation (environment), established in 1971 to distribute profits of the Whole Earth Catalogs
- Point Foundation (scholarship fund), founded in 2001 to provide financial aid for American LGBTQIA college students
