= The New Woman's Survival Catalog =

Second-wave feminist publication

The New Women's Survival Catalog
- Categories: Catalog
- Publisher: Published by Coward, McCann & Geoghegan, Inc./Berkley Publishing Corporation
- Founder: Kirsten Grimstad and Susan Rennie
- First issue: 1973; 52 years ago
- Country: United States
- Language: English

The New Women's Survival Catalog is a 1973 book, the collective outcome of an influential survey of second-wave feminist network activities across the United States. It was assembled in five months by Kirsten Grimstad and Susan Rennie. The book was promoted as a "feminist Whole Earth Catalog", referring to Stewart Brand's famous 1968–1972 counterculture magazine. The book was reissued by art book publisher Primary Information in September 2019.

== Content ==
The New Woman's Survival Catalog, styled as a typical sales catalog, contains listings, close descriptions, articles, and contact information for feminist organizations and resources in North America. Another section details the publication's research and production process.

The publication's content focuses on nine subjects, each marking its own chapter.

The book opens with "I Communications", listing, amongst others, feminist presses, radios and publications. "II Art" marks the second subject, summarizing galleries, collectives, theatre and other feminist artistic approaches. "III Self-Health" and "IV Children" follow with information about the body, medical care, single parents and liberating literature examples. The fifth chapter is called "V Learning" summarizing liberation schools, feminist studies and women in history. "VI Self Defense" and "VII Work and Money" mark the next subjects, giving self help advice and contacts on both issues. The last two chapters "VIII Getting Justice" and "IX Building the Movement" state information about discrimination, legal sources, women's rights, women's organizations and centers, and are more focussed on the active fight for women's rights in terms of the second wave feminist movement and politically contextualizing the before mentioned subjects.

== Making the book ==
The New Woman's Survival Catalog originally started as a women's studies bibliography from the Barnard College Women's Center. Kirsten Grimstad was an alumna of Barnard at that time and had the task to put it together. She thought "the bibliography needed to have an activist dimension to it, otherwise it wouldn't be feminist". Together with Susann Rennie, who was at the board of the Women's Center, they conducted a nationwide survey to gather information and sold the concept as "the woman's Whole Earth Catalog" to the publisher, Coward, McCann & Geoghegan.

During summer 1973 Grimstad and Rennie set out on a two-month roadtrip, covering 12,000 miles across the country, to speak directly with groups and get information on site. On July 13, Grimstad and Rennie returned and began sorting the material. The following August, production of the book began. Fanette Pollack and Ruth Bayard Smith helped the authors with copywriting and page layouts. Mark St. Giles was responsible for the typesetting, which she did on an IBM Selectric Composer.

On September 15 the paste up began with help from Peggy Lyons and Leslie Korda Krims. On October 3 the camera-ready copy was delivered to print.

The whole catalog was put together in five months, two of which Rennie and Grimstad spent on the road. According to the editors reflection in the last section of the book "The book was therefore made under terrific pressure," which is one factor for the catalog appearing with an aesthetic between DIY culture and a commercial sales catalog. Reasons for working so fast were, amongst others, the fast aging character that is implicit to the kind of information that is presented, as well as seasonal commercial timing.

== Resulting works and projects ==
Chrysalis

Chrysalis: A Magazine of Women's Culture was an influential feminist publication. It was collectively produced by artists and writers from the Los Angeles feminist movement and published from 1977 to 1980 by Susan Rennie and Kirsten Grimstad. Continuing the DIY feminist publishing culture, they got together with Sheila Levrant de Bretteville who did the magazine's graphic design.

Chrysalis was placed in the Woman's Building, a radical arts community that existed in a spacious building near downtown L.A. Throughout the 1970s, self-publication was critical to the success and maintenance of feminist communities. Highlighting itself from other similar publications of the time Like Heresies, Chrysalis reached and engaged a broader audience with more progressive issues. With its collaged articles on women's health, movement politics, as well as commissioning new fiction, poetry, and art portfolios, the Chrysalis magazine covered not only art world politics but rather brought up issues that affected the whole women's community.

The Chrysalis bureaucracy was based on consensus, editorial decisions were outcome of a collective process.

Intended as a quarterly publication, the collective produced only ten issues, before they had to resign in 1980, due to lack of funding.
