= Lloyd Kahn =

American author, editor, carpenter (born 1935)

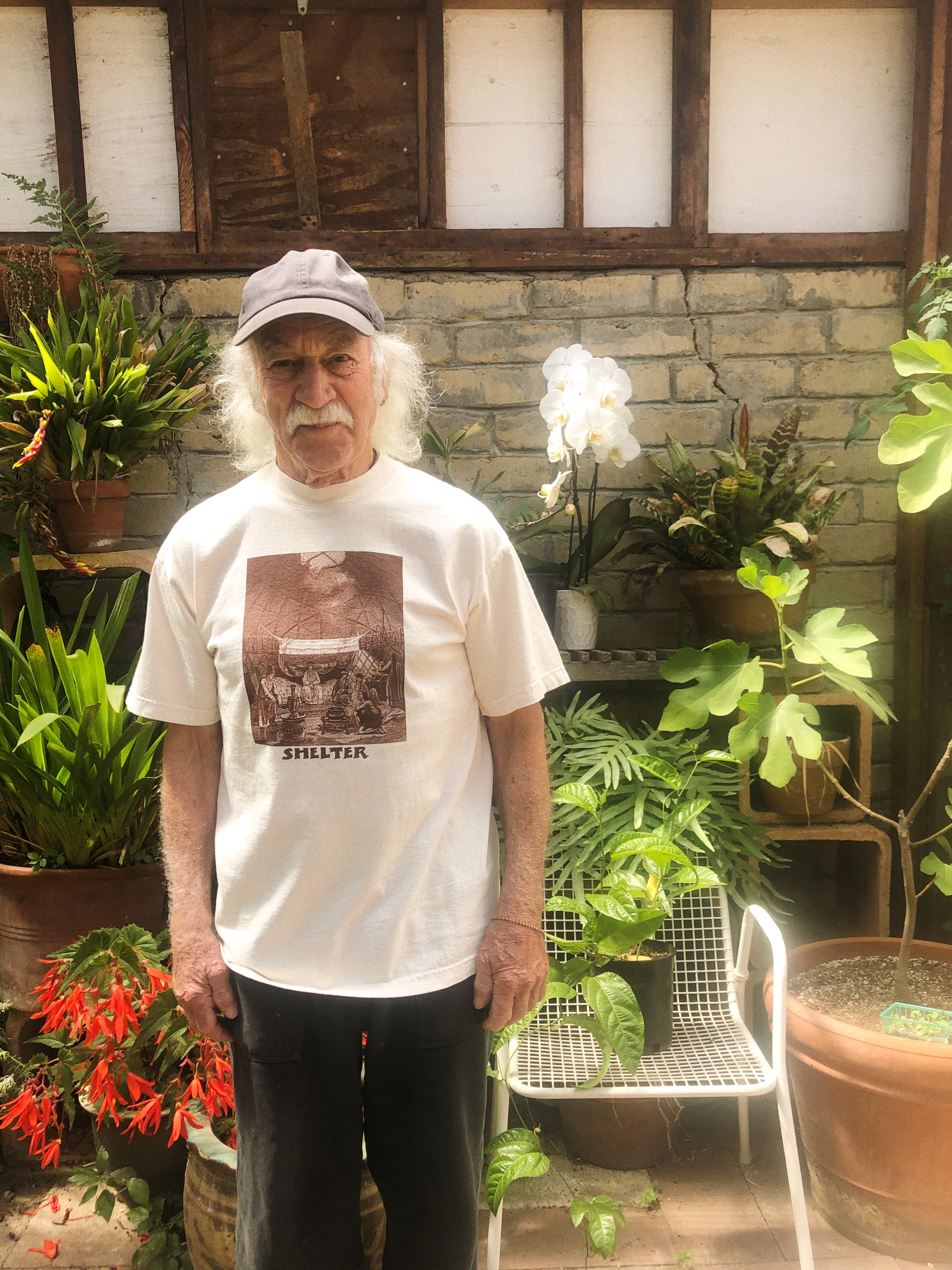
- Lloyd Kahn (2021) in his greenhouse
- Born: April 28, 1935 (age 91); San Francisco, California, U.S.
- Education: Stanford University (BA)
- Occupations: Publisher, editor, author, photographer, carpenter, self-taught architect
- Known for: Green building, green architecture
- Spouse: Lesley Susan Creed
- Children: 2

Lloyd Kahn (born April 28, 1935) is an American publisher, editor, author, photographer, carpenter, and self-taught architect. He is the founding editor-in-chief of Shelter Publications, Inc., and is the former editor of the Whole Earth Catalog. He is a pioneer of the green building and green architecture movements. His book Shelter (1973) about DIY architecture, has sold more than 250,000 copies.

He lives in the community of Bolinas in Marin County, California.

== Early life and education ==
Lloyd Kahn was born April 28, 1935, in San Francisco, California. Kahn became interested in construction at age 12 when working on his family's house in the Central Valley. He graduated from Lowell High School and earned a B.A. degree (1957) from Stanford University.

== Career ==
During the late 1950s, while serving in the United States Air Force in Germany, Kahn ran the USAF newspaper for two years. He returned to California in 1960 to work as an insurance broker but quit his job in 1965 and began work as a carpenter, eventually building four houses.

=== Green building ===
Kahn's first project was a sod-roof studio in Mill Valley, with succulents planted on the roof. He often used salvaged wood for his projects, in San Francisco he would buy from Cleveland Wreckers, a local wrecking company.

Influenced by Buckminster Fuller, Kahn started building geodesic domes in 1968. This resulted in a job coordinating with Jay Baldwin the building of 17 domes at the Pacific Collegiate School, an alternative school in the Santa Cruz mountains. Experimenting with geodesic domes made from plywood, aluminum, sprayed foam, and vinyl, the children built their own domes and lived in them. Jay Baldwin built a dome covered with vinyl pillows. When Buckminster Fuller visited the school in 1970, he commissioned Baldwin to build a replica of the dome on his property in Maine. The school received media attention.

=== Editing and publishing ===
Kahn next worked for Stewart Brand as Shelter editor for the Whole Earth Catalog. In 1970, Kahn published his first book, Domebook One, followed the next year with Domebook 2, which sold 165,000 copies. In 1971, he bought a half-acre lot in Bolinas, California, and built a shake-covered geodesic dome (later featured in Life magazine). After living in his dome for a year, Kahn decided domes did not work well: he stopped the printing of Domebook 2 and disassembled and sold his dome. He then went in search of other (non-dome) ways to build, writing Shelter (1973) about his findings. As of 2020, Shelter (1973) has sold around 300,000 copies.

During the next two decades, Shelter Publications produced a series of fitness books, including Bob Anderson's Stretching (which has sold three million copies and is in 31 languages), Galloway's Book on Running by Olympian Jeff Galloway, and Getting Stronger by legendary bodybuilder Bill Pearl. From 1997 to 2015, Shelter Publishing also produced StretchWare, software by Bob Anderson that reminds you to stretch at your computer.

In 2004, Kahn published Home Work: Handbuilt Shelter. Home Work summarizes the best of his work over the past 30 years photographing buildings and interviewing builders, and includes numerous buildings directly inspired by the book Shelter. The Septic Systems Owner's Manual, first published in 2000, was extensively revised in 2007. In 2008 Shelter Publications published the first English translation of Brazilian architect Johan van Lengen's The Barefoot Architect: A Manual on Green Building. Also in 2008, Kahn authored Builders of the Pacific Coast. Kahn authored a photo book about tiny houses, titled Tiny Homes: Simple Shelter published January 2012. Kahn's newest book is Tiny Homes on the Move published in April, 2014.

In 2016, Kahn had a solo exhibition of his photography, Lloyd Kahn: Driftwood Shelters, curated by Jennifer Gately at the Bolinas Museum.

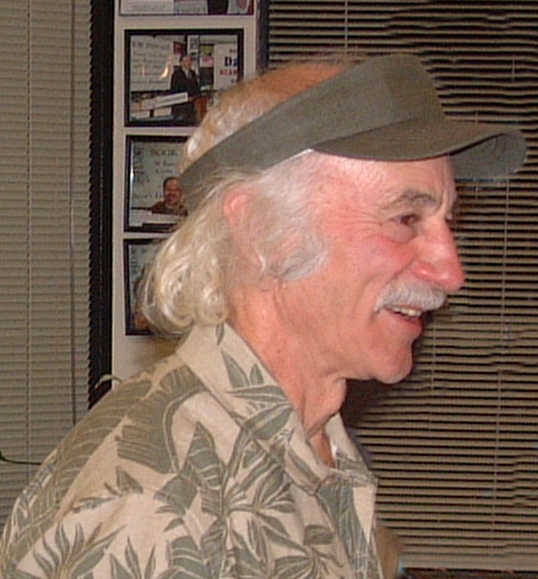
Lloyd Kahn (2004) at book signing

== Personal life ==
Khan was married to Lesley Susan Creed and has two sons. He lives in Bolinas, California. Kahn continues to surf, paddle board, trail running, and skateboard (longboard).

== Publications ==
=== As author ===
- Kahn, Lloyd (1970). Domebook One. Robert Easton (contributor), Pacific Domes (contributor). Pacific Domes.
- Kahn, Lloyd (1971). Domebook 2. Bolinas, CA: Shelter Publications.
- Kahn, Lloyd (1986). Over The Hill But Not Out to Lunch. Bolinas, CA: Shelter Publishing. ISBN 9780895864574.
- Kahn, Lloyd; Allen, Blair; Jones, Julie (2006). Hulls, John (ed.). The Septic System Owner's Manual. Crafts Series, Shelter Series. Bolinas, CA: Shelter Publications. ISBN 978-0-936070-40-7.
- Kahn, Lloyd (2004). Home Work: Handbuilt Shelter. Bolinas, CA: Shelter Publications. ISBN 978-0-936070-33-9.
- Kahn, Lloyd (2008). Builders of the Pacific Coast. Bolinas, CA: Shelter Publications. ISBN 978-0-936070-43-8.
- Kahn, Lloyd (2012). Lloyd. Bolinas, CA: Tiny Homes: Simple Shelter. ISBN 978-0-936070-52-0.
- Kahn, Lloyd (2014). Tiny Homes on the Move: Wheels and Water. Bolinas, CA: Shelter Publications. ISBN 978-0-936070-62-9.
- Kahn, Lloyd (2017). Small Homes: The Right Size. Bolinas, CA: Shelter Publications. ISBN 978-0-936070-68-1.
- Kahn, Lloyd (2018). Pop's Diner. Bolinas, CA: Shelter Publications. ISBN 9780936070797.
- Kahn, Lloyd (2019). Driftwood Shacks: Anonymous Architecture Along the California Coast. Bolinas, CA: Shelter Publications. ISBN 978-0-936070-80-3.
- Kahn, Lloyd (2020). The Half-Acre Homestead. Bolinas, CA: Shelter Publications. ISBN 978-0-936070-81-0.

=== As editor ===
- Kahn, Lloyd; Easton, Bob, eds. (1973). Shelter. Bolinas, CA: Shelter Publications. ISBN 978-0-936070-11-7.
- Hargittai, Istvan; Hargittai, Magdolna (1994). Kahn, Lloyd (ed.). Symmetry: A Unifying Concept. Bolinas, CA: Shelter Publications. ISBN 9780898155907.

=== As publisher ===
- Stretching (publisher, 1980)
- Galloway's Book on Running (publisher, 1984)
- Getting Stronger (publisher, 1985)
- Getting in Shape (publisher, 1995)
- Marathon: You Can Do It! (publisher, 2001)

== See also ==
- Mickey Muennig
