= The Adventurer's Handbook =

The Adventurer's Handbook is a 1984 role-playing game supplement published by Reston Publishing.

== Contents ==
The Adventurer's Handbook is a supplement in which an accessible introduction is provided to the world of role‑playing games, offering a clear explanation of what they are and how they function. It guides readers step by step through the process of creating a character using the Basic Role-Playing system, then demonstrates how to bring that character to life by playing through a few short scenarios. In its final section, the book provides an overview and comparison of the major role‑playing game systems that were available around 1982.

== Publication history ==
The Adventurer's Handbook was written by Bob Albrecht and Greg Stafford and published by Reston Publishing Company in 1984 as a 204-page book.

== Reviews ==
- The Rainbow
