= Chrysalis (magazine) =

American feminist publication (1977–1980)

Cover of Volume 1, 1977

Chrysalis: A Magazine of Women's Culture was a feminist publication produced from 1977 to 1980. The self-published magazine was founded by Kirsten Grimstad and Susan Rennie at the Woman's Building in downtown Los Angeles. Chrysalis grew from Grimstad and Rennie's editorial work on the self-help resource books, The New Woman's Survival Catalog and The New Woman's Survival Sourcebook. Chrysalis distinguished itself from other feminist publications through an organic integration of politics, literature, cultural studies, and art. The magazine was produced through a collective process that grew out of the feminist practice of consciousness-raising. Unusually broad in scope, Chrysalis did not substitute breadth for quality. The authors, poets, essayists, and researchers contributing to the magazine reveal a veritable who's who of towering intellects of the feminist movement: black lesbian activist Audre Lorde; the magazine's poetry editor, Robin Morgan, who later served as editor of Ms. from 1990-1993: award winning poet Adrienne Rich; novelist Marge Piercy; artist Judy Chicago; science fiction writer Joanna Russ; art critic Lucy Lippard, plus Mary Daly, Dolores Hayden, Andrea Dworkin, Marilyn Hacker, Arlene Raven, and Elizabeth Janeway. Over a three-year span, the all volunteer staff produced ten issues before they were forced to disband in 1981 due to financial difficulties.

== Topics ==
Like the east coast publication Heresies: A Feminist Publication on Art and Politics, which was founded the same year, Chrysalis served the burgeoning second-wave feminist movement. Art historian Jenni Sorkin compares the legacy of the two, writing "While Heresies remains the better-known publication, it is Chrysalis that engaged a broader public, covering progressive issues that affected the women’s community at large without taking an insular view of art world-only politics, or the thematic issues for which Heresies became widely known."

The editors of Chrysalis called the magazine "a vehicle for exploring the radical changes which women are initiating in the realms of theory and praxis." The magazine explored a wide range of topics, including: ecology; Freud and sexual abuse of children; pornography; feminist theory; religion; lesbianism; feminist art and literature; and women’s domestic life. Volume 7 featured Adrienne Rich's important essay "'Disloyal to Civilization': Feminism, Racism, and Gynephobia."
