= Mike Phillips =

Mike Phillips may refer to:

- Mike Phillips (American football) (1921–1994), American football center for the Baltimore Colts
- Mike Phillips (baseball) (born 1950), American former professional baseball player
- Mike Phillips (basketball, born 1956) (1956–2015), American basketball player
- Mike Phillips (basketball, born 2002), Filipino basketball player
- Mike Phillips (footballer) (1933–2020), Scottish footballer
- Mike Phillips (illustrator) (born 1961), British children's book illustrator
- Mike Phillips (Montana politician) (born 1958), Montana State Representative
- Mike Phillips (rugby union) (born 1982), Welsh international rugby union footballer
- Mike Phillips (speech recognition) (born 1961), pioneer in machine learning and speech recognition
- Mike Phillips (writer) (born 1941), British writer
- Michael Brandon (pornographic actor) (born 1965), sometimes credited as Mike Phillips

== See also ==
- Michael Phillips (disambiguation)
