= Whole Earth Software Catalog and Review =

Extensions of Stewart Brand's Whole Earth Catalog

The Whole Earth Software Catalog and The Whole Earth Software Review (1984–1985) were two publications produced by Stewart Brand's Point Foundation as an extension of the Whole Earth Catalog.

== Overview ==
Fred Turner discusses the production and eventual demise of both the Catalog and Review in From Counterculture to Cyberculture: Stewart Brand, the Whole Earth Network, and the Rise of Digital Utopianism. Turner notes that in 1983, The Whole Earth Software Catalog was proposed by John Brockman as a magazine which "would do for computing what the original [Whole Earth Catalog] had done for the counterculture: identify and recommend the best tools as they emerged." Brand announced the first publication of the quarterly Whole Earth Software Review at the SoftCon trade show at the Louisiana Superdome in New Orleans in March 1984. While both were published as an extension of Whole Earth, the Catalog was a large glossy book sponsored by Doubleday and published in Sausalito California while the Review was a small periodical published in San Diego. The Catalog and Review were notable for being "devoid of any industry advertising" and for being "accessible and user friendly - written in an glib, conversational style that takes most of the bugs out of microprocessing."

The Whole Earth Software Catalog and Review were both business failures, however. The Catalog was only published twice and The Whole Earth Software Review three times. At the same time, another Brand publication, CoEvolution Quarterly evolved out of the original Whole Earth Supplement in 1974. In 1985, Brand merged CoEvolution Quarterly with The Whole Earth Software Review to create the Whole Earth Review. This is also indicated in the issues themselves. Fall 1984, Issue No. 43 is titled The Last CoEvolution Quarterly.The cover also states, "Next issue is 'Whole Earth Review': livelier snake, new skin." In January 1985, Issue No. 44 was titled Whole Earth Review: Tools and Ideas for the Computer Age. The cover also reads "The continuation of CoEvolution Quarterly and Whole Earth Software Review." In an article titled "Whole Earth Software Catalog Version 1.1," Stewart Brand states that there are three intended audiences for the new Whole Earth Review: a) the audience of The Whole Earth Software Catalog, b) the audience of The Whole Earth Software Review and c) the audience of CoEvolution Quarterly.

== Bibliography ==
Whole Earth Software Review

- Spring 1984, Issue 1
- Summer 1984, Issue 2
- Fall 1984, Issue 3

Whole Earth Software Catalog

- Whole Earth Software Catalog. Spring 1984 by Point.
- Whole Earth Software Catalog for 1986 (2.0 edition). 1984, 1985 by Point (Winter 1986).
