= Portola Institute =

- Type: Nonprofit
- Founded: Menlo Park, California (1966)
- Founder: Richard Harrington Raymond, aka Dick Raymond
- Headquarters: 1115 Merrill St. Menlo Park, California U.S.
- Key people: J. Richard Suchman, Bob Albrecht, Stewart Brand, Carol Goodell

The Portola Institute was a "nonprofit educational foundation" founded in Menlo Park, California in 1966 by Dick Raymond. Raymond had previously worked in the urban planning division of the Stanford Research Institute (SRI), in Menlo Park, where his specialties included land use, recreational economics, and community development. Much of the Portola Institute's function and influence developed increasingly in the direction of environmental and social sustainability.

What set the Portola Institute’s mission apart from that of conventional educational institutions was the way in which the practicality principle played out. The Institute was never intended to be involved with academic credits and did not confer diplomas or degrees. Rather, it provided diverse opportunities for individuals to learn in some area of personal fascination, through exploring and doing. As an example, writer Peter Collier visited Portola in the early 1970s and described how, in one of the Institute's divisions, "a man with goggles and a welding torch is putting together an airplane" which he obtained in kit form from a company featured in the Whole Earth Catalog. One significant aspect of Portola was the issuing of publications, and these were intended to inform people about how to do something or make something — that is, to actually apply technical principles.

J. Richard Suchman, a psychologist from the faculty of the University of Illinois, became active in a project of the Institute during the late 1960s and early ’70s. Suchman's prior experience included doing research on fostering investigation and critical thinking among elementary-school students. Using Portola funding, he organized the Ortega Park Teachers Laboratory. Computer education pioneer Bob Albrecht launched Portola's computer division, and his experience in the Institute aided the development of his subsequent venture, the People's Computer Company. Through the Portola Institute, Raymond later lent financial support to efforts such as the Homebrew Computer Club, whose members included Steve Jobs and Steve Wozniak.

Portola was the publisher of Stewart Brand's Whole Earth Catalog, beginning with the first issue in 1968. That issue noted that the Catalog was "one division of the Portola Institute", and that other activities of the Institute included "simulation games for classroom use, [and] new approaches to music education." The WEC has often been viewed as a counterculture publication; commenting on books reviewed in its pages, and proposing a broader interpretation, French architect and academic Caroline Maniaque has written "counter-cultural publications are a distinct minority among the books that the Catalog recommended to its readers. The books recommended for (or by) the readers included all kinds of practical information, ranging from where to buy seeds, tools and clothing, through reflections on the universe, and all the way to philosophical, scientific and geographical textbooks. This broad informational reach ensured the WEC’s unquestionable success."

Commenting on the Institute's fresh vision, writer Maggie Engler opined that Portola's computer-related influence went beyond the experiments and pilot projects. She offered the view that once other Bay Area efforts were made to broaden personal-computer familiarity, it furthered “the Portola Institute goal of computer literacy for every age” — adults, of course, as well as younger people.

Carol Goodell, PhD, was co-founder of a partnership called Real World Learning, Inc. She was an educator and education theorist whose husband worked for IBM. Raymond learned of her work and invited her into Portola’s late-1960s collaborations. Some thirty years later, writer June Morrall drew out some of Goodell's memories of those years, and she related that many of the eager idea people attracted to the Institute were young. Goodell said that Dick Raymond embodied “a nice mix of compassion, enthusiasm and realism. Raymond’s role was to ferret out the most doable ideas.”

Quoting author Theodore Roszak's From Satori to Silicon Valley, Hallie Rose Scott commented on the Institute's inherent goal:

Portola aimed to "scale-down, democratize, and humanize our hypertrophic technological society" by serving as a platform for smaller initiatives and by providing young students with instruction in computers and later, portable video cameras.

Stewart Brand's project, the surprisingly successful editions of the Whole Earth Catalog (WECs), was directly in line with Portola's objectives. Subsequent publishing ventures of the Institute included Richard Merrill and Thomas Gage's technical Energy Primer: Solar, Water, Wind, and Biofuels, considered, for its time (1974), a fairly comprehensive introduction; Portola (in cooperation with Delta) published a second edition four years later.

As an offshoot of the Portola Institute, and its financial success with the WEC, Raymond and Stewart Brand collaborated to form the Point Foundation."
