= Michael Phillips =

Michael Phillips may refer to:

- Michael Phillips (Australian politician) (1851–1905), New South Wales politician
- Michael Phillips (consultant) (born 1938), created MasterCard in 1966
- Michael Phillips (historian) (born 1960)
- Michael Phillips (producer) (born 1943), American film producer
- Michael Phillips (writer) (born 1946), American Christian author
- Michael Phillips (psychiatrist), Canadian psychiatrist
- Michael Phillips (figure skater) (died 2016), British figure skater and ice dancer
- Michael Phillips (critic) (born 1961), American film critic
- Michael Phillips (footballer) (born 1983), English footballer
- Michael Phillips (barista)
- Michael Phillips (basketball, born 2002)

== See also ==
- Mike Phillips (disambiguation)
- Mikael Phillips, Jamaican politician
