= Bob Albrecht =

American writer

Bob Albrecht is a key figure in the early history of microcomputers. He was one of the founders of the People's Computer Company and its associated newsletters which turned into Dr. Dobb's Journal. He also brought the first Altair 8800 to the Homebrew Computer Club and was one of the main supporters of the effort to make Tiny BASIC a standard on many early machines. Albrecht has authored a number of books on BASIC and other computer topics. He is mentioned as one of the "who's who" in Steven Levy's Hackers: Heroes of the Computer Revolution.

== Career ==
In 1955 Albrecht was studying for a master's degree when he quit for a job at the Minneapolis-Honeywell Aeronautical Division in Minneapolis, which had entered the computer market in April that year. He was working in a large room of engineers on flight control systems for high-speed jet aircraft using analog techniques. After a few months he was invited to join work on an IBM 650 drum computer, with the intention that he would then promote the use of the computer amongst his erstwhile analog-working co workers.

In 1962, while working for Control Data Corporation as a senior applications analyst, he was asked to give a talk at George Washington High School in Denver. This incident prompted a career change after his interest was triggered by the young learners' response.

== People's Computer Company ==
After Albrecht left his job at Control Data Corporation, he became involved with a Menlo Park, California educational nonprofit called Portola Institute, founded by Dick Raymond. Afterwards, Albrecht launched his project called People's Computer Company in October 1972. It wasn't a company but a newsletter, that took its name in honor of Janis Joplin's band, Big Brother and the Holding Company. The newsletter operated with a walk-in storefront to teach children "about having fun with computers". A spinoff newsletter was called Dr. Dobb's Journal of Computer Calisthenics and Orthodontia. Albrecht's computer-book publishing company, Dymax, also brought computing to the people by teaching young students to program.

Albrecht wrote The Adventurer's Handbook with Greg Stafford, which was published by Reston Publishing Company in 1984.
