= Whole Earth Catalog =

American counterculture publication

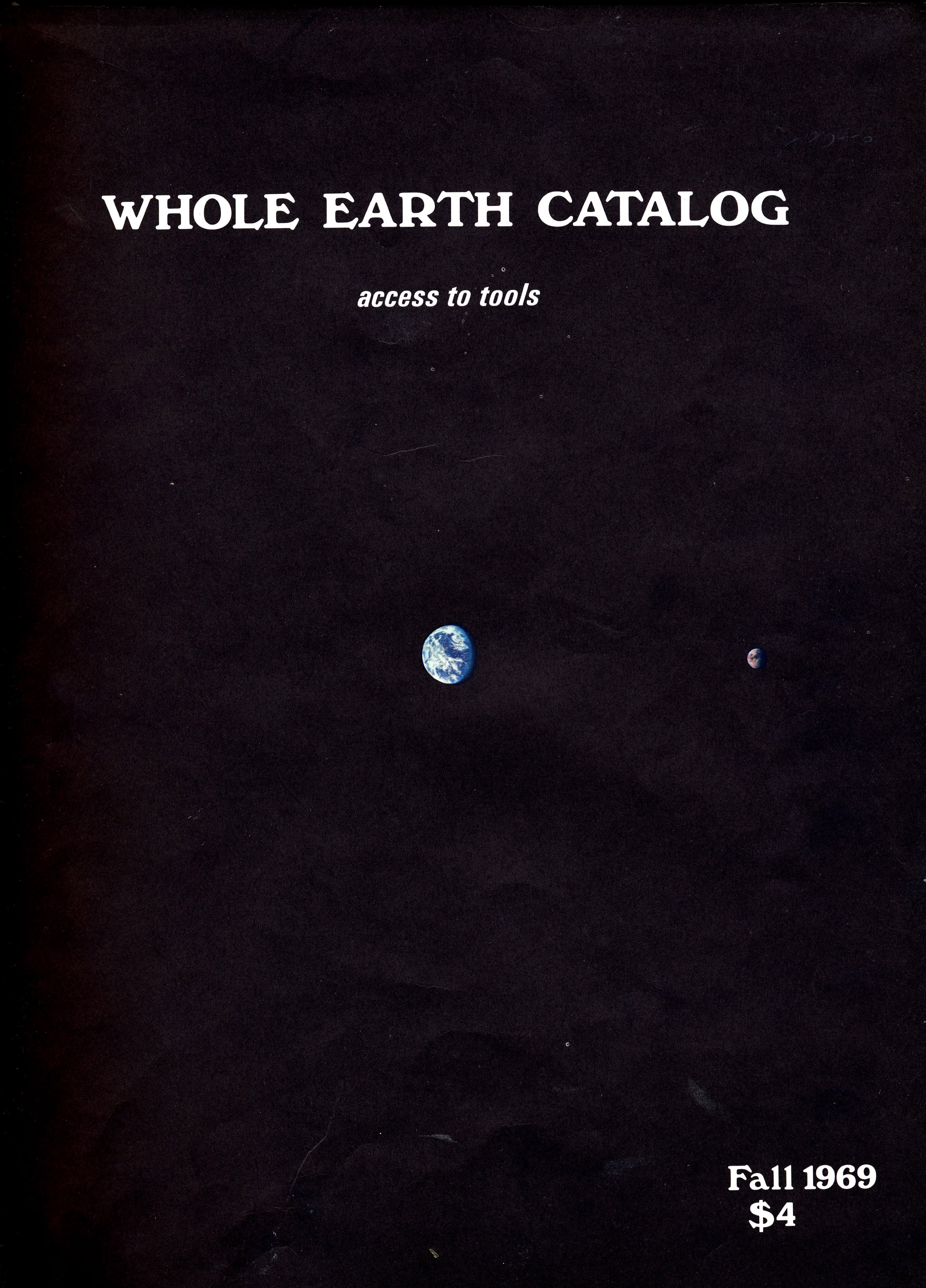
- The Fall 1969 issue of the Whole Earth Catalog
- Categories: Catalog
- Founder: Stewart Brand
- First issue: September 1, 1968; 58 years ago
- Final issue: June 1, 1971
- Country: United States
- Language: English

The Whole Earth Catalog (WEC) was an American counterculture magazine and product catalog. Stewart Brand, a biologist, photographer and writer, conceived the idea for it; he was the Catalog's original editor, and its most frequent editor in later years. It was originally published by the Portola Institute, but later by the Point Foundation, with a distribution arrangement by 1969 with Penguin and subsequently with Random House. New editions were published several times a year between 1968 and 1972, and occasionally thereafter, until 1998.

The magazine featured essays and articles, but was primarily focused on product reviews. The editorial focus was on self-sufficiency, ecology, alternative education, "do it yourself" (DIY), community, and holism, and featured the slogan "access to tools". Although WEC listed and reviewed a wide range of products (clothing, books, tools, machines, seeds, etc.), it did not sell any of the products directly. Instead, the vendor's contact information was listed alongside the item and its review. This is why, while not a regularly published periodical, numerous editions and updates were required to keep price and availability information up to date.

== Origins ==
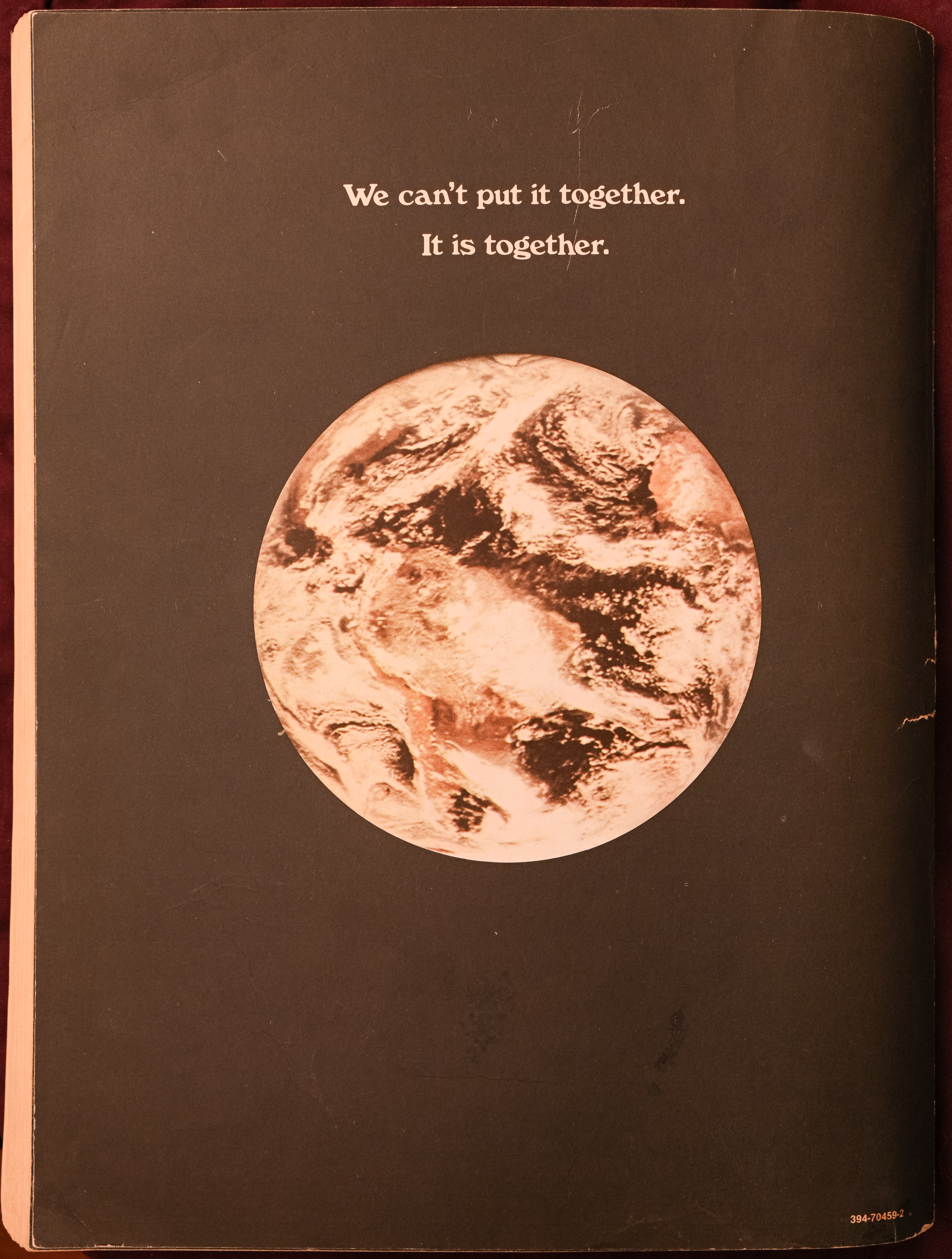
The Last Whole Earth Catalog back cover from August 1972 showing the ATS-3 satellite image of Earth used on the cover of the first issue

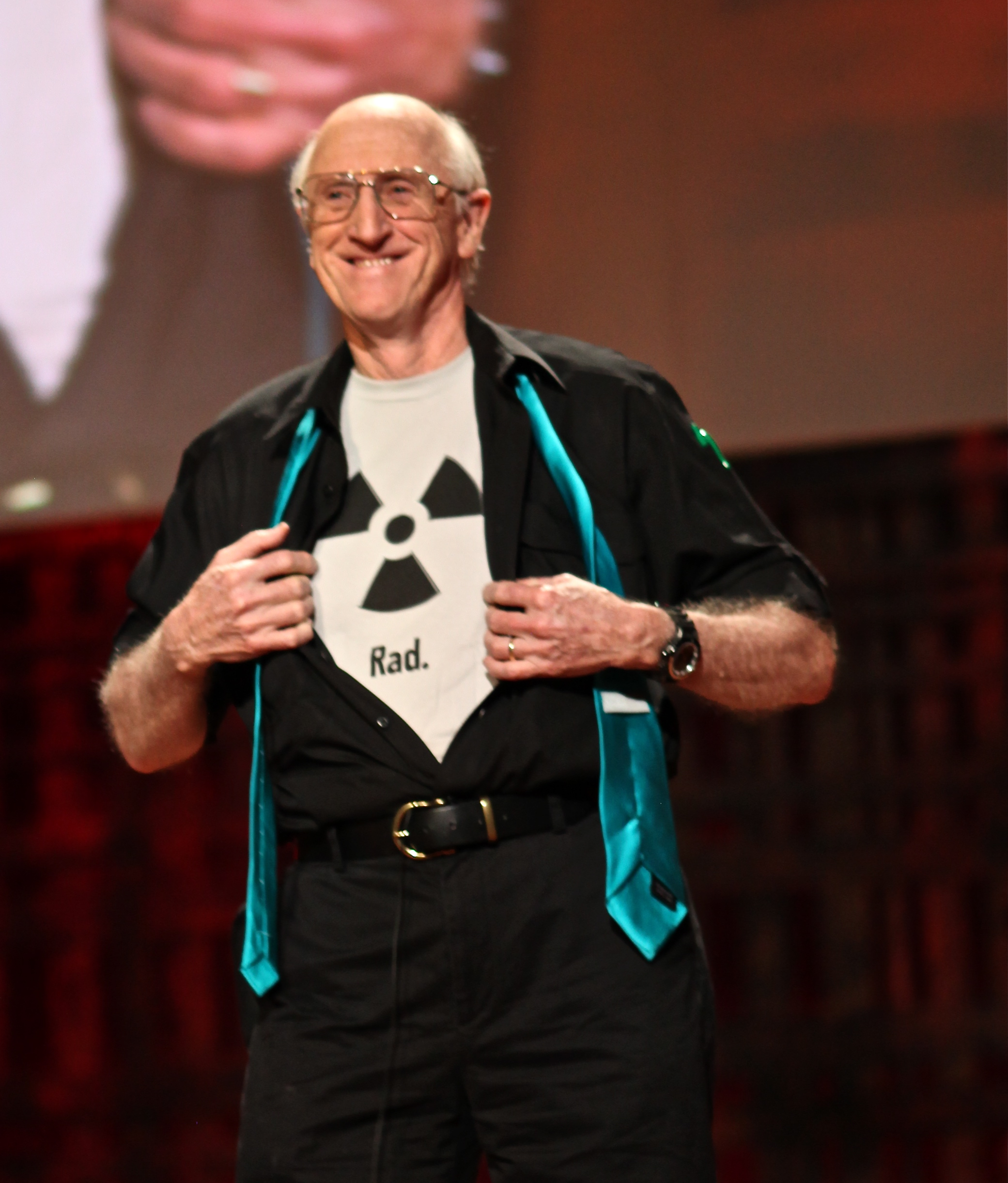
Stewart Brand in 2010

The title Whole Earth Catalog came from a previous project by Stewart Brand. In 1966, he initiated a public campaign to have NASA release the then-rumored satellite photo of the sphere of Earth as seen from space, one of the first images of the "Whole Earth". He thought the image might be a powerful symbol, evoking a sense of shared destiny and adaptive strategies from people. The Stanford-educated Brand, a biologist with strong artistic and social interests, believed that there was a groundswell of commitment to thoroughly renovating American industrial society along ecologically and socially just lines, whatever they might prove to be.

Andrew Kirk in Counterculture Green notes that the Whole Earth Catalog was preceded by the "Whole Earth Truck Store" which was a 1963 Dodge truck. In 1968, Brand, who was then 29, and his wife Lois embarked "on a commune road trip" with the truck, hoping to tour the country doing educational fairs. The truck was not only a store, but also an alternative lending library and a mobile microeducation service.

Kevin Kelly, who would edit later editions of the catalog, summarizes the very early history this way:

'Here's a tool that will make drilling a well, or grinding flour, easier,' Brand would tell [the hippies,] pointing it out in his catalog of recommended tools. But his best selling tool was the catalog itself, annotated by him, featuring tools that didn't fit into his truck.

The "Truck Store," as a Portola Institute project, finally settled into its permanent location in Menlo Park, California. Instead of bringing the store to the people, Brand decided to create "accumulatively larger versions of his tool catalog" and sell it by mail so the people could contact the vendors directly.

Using the most basic typesetting and page-layout tools, Brand and his colleagues created the first issue of The Whole Earth Catalog in 1968. In subsequent issues, its production values gradually improved. Its outsized pages measured 11×14 inches (28×36 cm). Later editions were more than an inch thick. The early editions were published by the Portola Institute, headed by Richard Raymond. The so-called Last Whole Earth Catalog (June 1971) won the first U.S. National Book Award in the Contemporary Affairs category. It was the first time a catalog had ever won such an award. Brand's intent with the catalog was to provide education and "access to tools" so a reader could "find his own inspiration, shape his own environment, and share his adventure with whoever is interested."

J. Baldwin was a young designer and instructor of design at colleges around the San Francisco Bay: San Francisco State University (then San Francisco State College), the San Francisco Art Institute, and the California College of the Arts (then California College of Arts and Crafts). As he recalled in the film Ecological Design (1994), "Stewart Brand came to me because he heard that I read catalogs. He said, 'I want to make this thing called a "whole Earth" catalog so that anyone on Earth can pick up a telephone and find out the complete information on anything. ... That's my goal.'" Baldwin served as the chief editor of subjects in the areas of technology and design, both in the catalog itself and in other publications which arose from it.

True to his 1966 vision, Brand's publishing efforts were suffused with an awareness of the importance of ecology, both as a field of study and as an influence upon the future of humankind and emerging human awareness.

== Contents ==
From the opening page of the 1969 Catalog:

Function

The WHOLE EARTH CATALOG functions as an evaluation and access device. With it, the user should know better what is worth getting and where and how to do the getting.

An item is listed in the CATALOG if it is deemed:

1. Useful as a tool,
2. Relevant to independent education,
3. High quality or low cost,
4. Not already common knowledge,
5. Easily available by mail.

CATALOG listings are continually revised according to the experience and suggestions of CATALOG users and staff.

Purpose

We are as gods and might as well get good at it. So far, remotely done power and glory—as via government, big business, formal education, church—has succeeded to the point where gross defects obscure actual gains. In response to this dilemma and to these gains a realm of intimate, personal power is developing—power of the individual to conduct his own education, find his own inspiration, shape his own environment, and share his adventure with whoever is interested. Tools that aid this process are sought and promoted by the WHOLE EARTH CATALOG.

The 1968 catalog divided itself into seven broad sections:

- Understanding Whole Systems
- Shelter and Land Use
- Industry and Craft
- Communications
- Community
- Nomadics
- Learning

Within each section, the best tools and books the editors could find were collected and listed, along with images, reviews and uses, prices, and suppliers. The reader was also able to order some items directly through the catalog.

Later editions changed a few of the headings, but generally kept the same overall framework.

The Catalog used a broad definition of "tools". There were informative tools, such as books, maps, professional journals, courses, and classes. There were well-designed special-purpose utensils, including garden tools, carpenters' and masons' tools, welding equipment, chainsaws, fiberglass materials, tents, hiking shoes, and potters' wheels. There were even early synthesizers and personal computers.

The Catalog's publication coincided with a great wave of convention-challenging experimentalism and a do-it-yourself attitude associated with "the counterculture," and tended to appeal not only to the intelligentsia of the movement, but to creative, hands-on, and outdoorsy people of many stripes. Some of the ideas in the Catalog were developed during Brand's visits to Drop City.

With the Catalog opened flat, the reader might find the large page on the left full of text and intriguing illustrations from a volume of Joseph Needham's Science and Civilization in China, showing and explaining an astronomical clock tower or a chain-pump windmill, while on the right-hand page are a review of a beginners' guide to modern technology (The Way Things Work) and a review of The Engineers' Illustrated Thesaurus. On another spread, the verso reviews books on accounting and moonlighting jobs, while the recto bears an article in which people tell the story of a community credit union they founded. Another pair of pages depict and discuss different kayaks, inflatable dinghies, and houseboats.

== Publication after 1972 ==
The catalog was published sporadically after 1972. An important shift in philosophy in the Catalogs occurred in the early 1970s, when Brand decided that the early stance of emphasizing individualism should be replaced with one favoring community. He had originally written that "a realm of intimate, personal power is developing"; regarding this as important in some respects (to wit, the soon-emerging potentials of personal computing), Brand felt that the overarching project of humankind had more to do with living within natural systems, and this is something we do in common, interactively.

The broad interpretation of "tool" coincided with that given by the designer, philosopher, and engineer Buckminster Fuller, though another thinker admired by Brand and some of his cohorts was Lewis Mumford, who had written about words as tools. Early editions reflected the considerable influence of Fuller, particularly his teachings about "whole systems," "synergetics," and efficiency or reducing waste. By 1971, Brand and his co-workers were already questioning whether Fuller's sense of direction might be too anthropocentric. New information arising in fields like ecology and biospherics was persuasive.

By the mid-1970s, much of the Buddhist economics viewpoint of E. F. Schumacher, as well as the activist interests of the biological species preservationists, had tempered the overall enthusiasm for Fuller's ideas in the catalog. Still later, the amiable-architecture ideas of people like Christopher Alexander and similar community-planning ideas of people like Peter Calthorpe further tempered the engineering-efficiency tone of Fuller's ideas.

The Whole Earth Epilog published in 1974 was intended as a "volume 2" to the Last Whole Earth Catalog, which itself was revised as The (Updated) Last Whole Earth Catalog in 1975.

The Next Whole Earth Catalog (ISBN 978-0-394-70776-1) in 1980 was well received, and an updated second edition followed in 1981. The 1980s also saw two editions of the Whole Earth Software Catalog, a compendium for which Doubleday had bid $1.4 million for the trade paperback rights. The 1986 publication of The Essential Whole Earth Catalog (ISBN 978-0-385-23641-6) preceded the 1989 Electronic Whole Earth Catalog on CD-ROM, which used HyperCard, an early form of hypermedia developed by Apple Computer. Dedicated editions were published for communications tools Signal in 1988, new age topics The Fringes of Reason in 1989, and ecological matters Whole Earth Ecolog in 1990.

Published in 1994, The Millennium Whole Earth Catalog (ISBN 978-0-06-251059-4) was subtitled Access to Tools and Ideas for the Twenty-First Century.

A slender 30th Anniversary Celebration was published in 1998 as part of Issue 95 of the Whole Earth magazine (ISSN 0749-5056), reprinting the original WEC along with new material. An important edit to this reprint was a limitation placed by book publishers who "begged" the Catalog not to promote titles they no longer carry. All such information was placed at the back of the catalog, hampering a valuable Catalog function: nudging publishers to keep seminal works in print.

== Publication history ==
No.	Date	Title	Editor	Pages	Price	Notable Contents	ISBN
#1010	Fall 1968	Whole Earth Catalog	Stewart Brand	64	$5	First WEC; cover photo: Earth from space	
#1020	January 1969	The Difficult But Possible Supplement to the Whole Earth Catalog	Stewart Brand	32	$1.65	Additions and price corrections	
#1030	March 1969	The Difficult But Possible Supplement to the Whole Earth Catalog	Stewart Brand	30	$1.65	Calls for subscribers to write to President Nixon urging establishment of the entire Earth as a National Park; establishes early support for computers with a photo of a Computer Club showing "two Commodore calculators"	
#1040	Spring 1969	Whole Earth Catalog	Stewart Brand (with Lloyd Kahn)	132	$4	Cover photo: Earthrise (Earth from the far side of the Moon); lists a $4,900 Hewlett Packard programmable calculator	
#1050	July 1969	Difficult But Possible Supplement to the Whole Earth Catalog	Stewart Brand	32	$1	Cover recounts a bus race between Ken Kesey's Further and three buses from Wavy Gravy's Hog Farm	
#1060	September 1969	Difficult But Possible Supplement to the Whole Earth Catalog	Stewart Brand	34	$1	Unanimous Declaration of Interdependence	
#1070	Fall 1969	Whole Earth Catalog	Stewart Brand (with Lloyd Kahn)	132	$4	Cover photo: Earth from deep space	ASIN B000KVJ3ZC
#1080	January 1970	Whole Earth Catalog: The Outlaw Area	Stewart Brand	56	$1	Cover photo: Arthur Godfrey; reprints long articles on The Outlaw Area, Liferaft Earth, Earth Peoples Park; dropped word "Supplement" to qualify for 2nd class postage	
	March 1970	Whole Earth Catalog: The World Game	Gurney Norman (with Diana Shugart)	56	$1	"Buckminster Fuller's World Game" by Gene Youngblood	
#1090	Spring 1970	Whole Earth Catalog	Stewart Brand (with Lloyd Kahn)	148	$3	Cover photo: M-31 Andromeda Galaxy, taken by the Lick Observatory	ASIN B001B6L98O
#1110	July 1970	Whole Earth Catalog	Gordon Ashby (with Doyle Phillips)	56	$1	"Find Your Place In Space" (a series of mandalas)	ASIN B00139YNAA
#1120	September 1970	Whole Earth Catalog	Gurney Norman (with Diana Schugart)	56	$1	"Think Little" by Wendell Berry; "Introducing Divine Right's Bus, Urge" by Gurney Norman	
#1130	Fall 1970	Whole Earth Catalog	J.D. Smith (with Hal Hershey)		$3		ASIN B001B6GKWO
#1140	January 1971	Whole Earth Catalog: Truth, Consequences	Stewart Brand	48	$1	Cover: Truth, Consequences, Back cover promotes Production in the Desert, Production in the Desert	
#1150	March 1971	The Last Supplement to The Whole Earth Catalog	Paul Krassner and Ken Kesey	132	$1	R. Crumb cover; "The Dream is Over" by J. Marks, "The Bible" by Ken Kesey. No catalog items, only essays and illustrations	ASIN B000GTN5BG
#1160	June 1971	The Last Whole Earth Catalog	Stewart Brand	452	$5	Divine Right's Trip by Gurney Norman serialized; review of available synthesizers by Wendy Carlos; cover photo: Earth from space, taken by Apollo 4; Winner, 1972 National Book Award	ISBN 978-0-394-70459-3
#1170	May 1971	Whole Earth Catalog					
	May 1974	The (Updated) Last Whole Earth Catalog		447	$5	"All listings accurate as of May 1974"	ISBN 978-0-394-70943-7
#1180	October 1974	Whole Earth Epilog		320	$4	Cover photo: Earthrise over the Moon by Apollo 12; "Tongue Fu" by Paul Krassner serialized	ISBN 978-0-14-003950-4
	June 1975	The (Updated) Last Whole Earth Catalog	Stewart Brand	452	$6	16th Edition, "How To Do a Whole Earth Catalog"	ISBN 978-0-14-003544-5
	December 1977	Space Colonies: Whole Earth Catalog	Stewart Brand	160	$5		ISBN 978-0-14-004805-6
#1220	September 1980	The Next Whole Earth Catalog	Stewart Brand	614	$12.50	Cover photo: Madagascar and Southern Africa from orbit by Apollo 17; more emphasis on space travel	ISBN 978-0-394-73951-9
	March 1981	The Next Whole Earth Catalog, revised	Stewart Brand	608	$16	Excerpts from The Rising Sun Neighborhood Newsletter by Anne Herbert serialized. Ron Jones' account of the Third Wave experiment.	ISBN 978-0-394-70776-1
	Spring 1984	Whole Earth Software Review, No.1	Stewart Brand				
	Summer 1984	Whole Earth Software Review, No.2	Stewart Brand				
	June 1984	Whole Earth Software Catalog 1.0	Stewart Brand	208	$17.50	software reviews for the burgeoning home computing market	ISBN 978-0-385-19166-1
	Fall 1984	Whole Earth Software Review No.3	Stewart Brand				
	Fall 1985	Whole Earth Software Catalog 2.0 1986	Stewart Brand	224	$17.50		ISBN 978-0-385-23301-9
#1280	September 1986	The Essential Whole Earth Catalog	J. Baldwin	416	$24.99	Published by Doubleday	ISBN 978-0-385-23641-6
	1988	Whole Earth Catalog: Signal Communication Tools for the Information Age	Kevin Kelly				ISBN 978-0-517-57083-8
	1989	The Fringes of Reason: A Whole Earth Catalog	Ted Schultz with Stewart Brand	223	$14.95	Focused on the occult and paranormal, with contributions from Jay Kinney, John Keel, Robert Anton Wilson, Ivan Stang, and others.	ISBN 978-0-517-57165-1
	1989	The Electronic Whole Earth Catalog	Stewart Brand	n.a.		Early version of hypertext, on CD-ROM	
	1990	Whole Earth Ecolog	James Baldwin	128	$15.95	Deals with ecology exclusively	ISBN 978-0-517-57658-8
#1330	December 1994	The Millennium Whole Earth Catalog	Howard Rheingold	410	$30	White cover with Earth as "o" in "Whole"; Frank's Real Pa by Jim Woodring serialized	ISBN 978-0-06-251059-4
#1340	December 1998	Whole Earth Catalog: 30th Anniversary Celebration	Peter Warshall with Stewart Brand	108	$14.95	The complete first WEC + new comments	ISBN 978-1-892907-05-9

== Books ==
Three books were serialized in the pages of the WEC, printing a couple of paragraphs per page. This made reading the catalog a page-by-page experience.

- Divine Right's Trip by Gurney Norman, July 1971 edition
- Tales of Tongue Fu by Paul Krassner, October 1974 edition
- The Rising Sun Neighborhood by Anne Herbert, March 1981 edition

== Impact and legacy ==
Steve Jobs compared The Whole Earth Catalog to Internet search engine Google in his June 2005 Stanford University commencement speech.

When I was young, there was an amazing publication called The Whole Earth Catalog, which was one of the bibles of my generation ... It was sort of like Google in paperback form, 35 years before Google came along. It was idealistic and overflowing with neat tools and great notions.

Then at the very end of this commencement speech Jobs quotes explicitly the farewell message placed on the back cover of the last 1974 edition of the Catalog (#1180 October 1974 titled Whole Earth Epilog) and makes it his own final recommendation: "Stay hungry. Stay foolish."

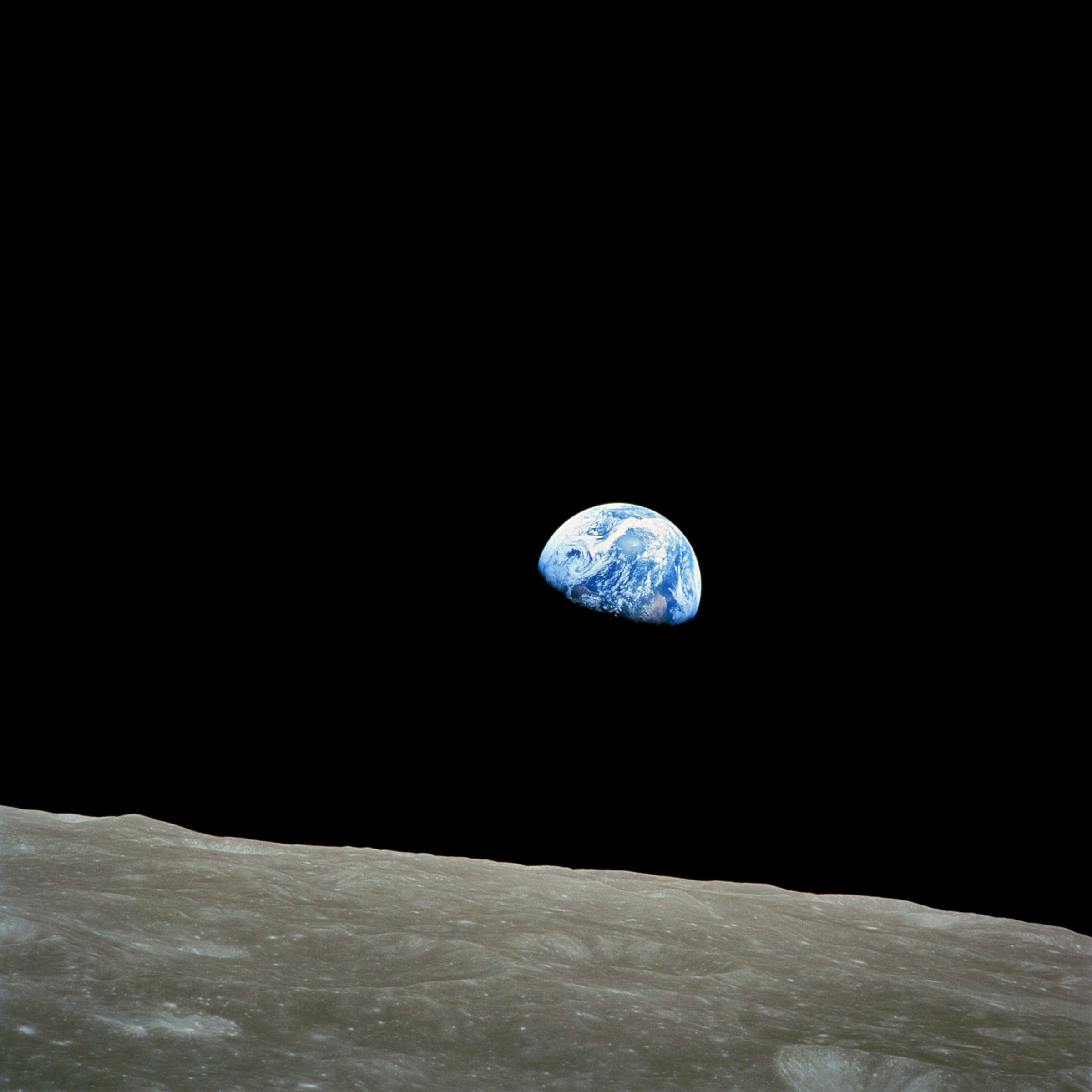
Earthrise, by William Anders, Apollo 8, 1968, the cover photo of the second and third editions

In 2009, Kevin Kelly stated:

For this new countercultural movement, information was a precious commodity. In the '60s, there was no Internet; no 500 cable channels. ... [The WEC] was a great example of user-generated content, without advertising, before the Internet. Basically, Brand invented the blogosphere long before there was any such thing as a blog. ... No topic was too esoteric, no degree of enthusiasm too ardent, no amateur expertise too uncertified to be included. ... This I am sure about: it is no coincidence that the Whole Earth Catalogs disappeared as soon as the web and blogs arrived. Everything the Whole Earth Catalogs did, the web does better.

Looking back and discussing attitudes evident in the early editions of the catalog, Brand wrote, "At a time when the New Left was calling for grassroots political (i.e., referred) power, Whole Earth eschewed politics and pushed grass-roots direct power—tools and skills."

As an early indicator of the general Zeitgeist, the catalog's first edition preceded the original Earth Day by nearly two years. The idea of Earth Day occurred to Senator Gaylord Nelson, its instigator, "in the summer of 1969 while on a conservation speaking tour out west," where the Sierra Club was active, and where young minds had been broadened and stimulated by such influences as the catalog.

=== Spin-offs and inspirations ===
From 1974 to 2003, the Whole Earth principals published a magazine, known originally as CoEvolution Quarterly. When the short-lived Whole Earth Software Review (a supplement to The Whole Earth Software Catalog) failed, it was merged in 1985 with CoEvolution Quarterly to form the Whole Earth Review (edited at different points by Jay Kinney, Kevin Kelly, and Howard Rheingold), later called Whole Earth Magazine and finally just Whole Earth. The last issue, number 111 (edited by Alex Steffen), was meant to be published in Spring 2003, but funds ran out. The Point Foundation, which owned Whole Earth, closed its doors later that year.

The Whole Earth website continues the WEC legacy of concepts in popular discourse, medical self-care, community building, bioregionalism, environmental restoration, nanotechnology, and cyberspace. As of January 2022, the website appears to be offline.

Recognizing the "developed country" focus of the original WEC, groups in several developing countries have created "catalogs" of their own to be more relevant to their countries. One such effort was an adaptation of the WEC (called the "Liklik Buk") written and published in the late 1970s in Papua New Guinea; by 1982 this had been enlarged, updated, and translated (as "Save Na Mekem") into the Pidgin language used throughout Melanesia, and updates of the English "Liklik Buk" were published in 1986 and 2003.

In the United States, the book Domebook One was a direct spin-off of the WEC. Lloyd Kahn, Shelter editor of the WEC, borrowed WEC production equipment for a week in 1970 and produced the first book on building geodesic domes. A year later, in 1971, Kahn again borrowed WEC equipment (an IBM Selectric Composer typesetting machine and a Polaroid MP-5 camera on an easel), and spent a month in the Santa Barbara Mountains producing Domebook 2, which went on to sell 165,000 copies. With production of DB 2, Kahn and his company Shelter Publications followed Stewart Brand's move to nationwide distribution by Random House.

In 1973, Kirsten Grimstad and Susan Rennie are part of a research project at Berkeley University and publish a feminist catalog inspired by the Whole Earth Catalog, the New Woman's Survival Catalog, which gathers feminist initiatives in different domains (art, communication, work, money, self-help, self-defense...) in the USA.

In 1969, a store which was inspired by (but not financially connected with) The Whole Earth Catalog, called the Whole Earth Access opened in Berkeley, California. It closed in 1998. Similarly, outdoors store "Whole Earth Provision Co." opened in Austin, Texas in 1970.

In late 2006, Worldchanging released their 600-page compendium of solutions, Worldchanging: A User's Guide for the 21st Century, which Bill McKibben, in an article in the New York Review of Books called "The Whole Earth Catalog retooled for the iPod generation." The editor of Worldchanging has since acknowledged the Catalog as a prime inspiration.

Whole Arctic Catalog was written by Pamela Richot and Published in Backet 3: At Extremes in 2015 to draw attention to threats to the arctic region specifically, similarly to how The Whole Earth Catalog drew attention to global environmental threats.

Baker Creek Heirloom Seeds publishes a Whole Seed Catalog, with a title and cover image inspired by the Whole Earth Catalog.

Kevin Kelly, mentioned above for his role in editing later editions of the Whole Earth Catalog, maintains a web site—Cool-Tools.org—that publishes reviews of "the best/cheapest tools available. Tools are defined broadly as anything that can be useful. This includes hand tools, machines, books, software, gadgets, websites, maps, and even ideas." He also published a large format book in 2013—Cool Tools A Catalog of Possibilities—which draws on the many reviews published over the years on that web site. The format, size, and style of the book reflect and pay homage to the original Whole Earth Catalog.

=== In popular culture ===
In 1970, on April Fool's Day, the Whole Earth Restaurant opened at UC Santa Cruz. It was an early source of "whole foods" in Northern California until it closed in 2002.

In 1972 Warner Bros. Records release a 2 disc sample album The Whole Burbank Catalog. The cover parodied the publication's artwork.

The WEC is mentioned in the song "Country Man," the title track from the 1972 debut album by Canadian musician Valdy: "Feed the cat, feed the dog, feed the chickens, chop the log / Have a smoke and clear the fog, read the Whole Earth Catalog." It is also mentioned in the piece "The Adventures of Greggery Peccary" by Frank Zappa: "I must plummet boldly forward to my ultra-avant laminated, simulated replica-mahogany desk, with the strategically-placed, imported, very hip water pipe, and the latest edition of the WHOLE EARTH CATALOG, and rack my agile mind for a spectacular new TREND, thereby rejuvenating our limping economy, and providing for bored & miserable people everywhere some great new 'THING' to identify with!"

A 2010 issue of the political art magazine made by the Adbusters Media Foundation was titled The Whole Brain Catalog, which features a parody cover with a small human brain in place of the earth, and many references to the 1960s counter culture movement. The tagline read Access to Therapies rather than Access to Tools.

On April 17, 2018, My Morning Jacket frontman Jim James announced the release of his third solo album Uniform Distortion, which he stated was inspired by The Whole Earth Catalog.

== Scholarship ==
Stewart Brand and The Whole Earth Catalog are both subjects of interest to scholars. Notable examples include works by Theodore Roszak, Howard Rheingold, Fred Turner, John Markoff, Andrew Kirk, Sam Binkley and Felicity Scott. The Stanford University Library System has a Whole Earth archive in its Department of Special Collections.

== See also ==
- List of underground newspapers of the 1960s counterculture
- We Are As Gods (book)
