= Whole Earth Discipline =

2009 book by Stewart Brand

- Author: Stewart Brand
- Original title: Whole Earth Discipline: An Ecopragmatist Manifesto
- Publisher: Viking Penguin
- Publication date: 2009
- ISBN: 978-0-670-02121-5

Whole Earth Discipline: An Ecopragmatist Manifesto is the sixth book by Stewart Brand, published by Viking Penguin in 2009. He sees Earth and people propelled by three transformations: climate change (global warming), urbanization and biotechnology. Brand tackles "touchy issues" like nuclear power, genetic engineering and geoengineering, "fully aware that many of the environmentalist readers he hopes to reach will start out disagreeing with him".

== Overview ==
Brand said in an interview with Seed magazine, "...I'd accumulated a set of contrarian views on some important environmental issues—specifically, cities, nuclear energy, genetic engineering, and geoengineering—and that it added up to a story worth telling."

The author cites numerous other authors both in the recommended reading section and in live lectures. In particular, book influences are Constant Battles by Steven A. LeBlanc with Katherine Register, Shadow Cities: A Billion Squatters, a New Urban World by Robert Neuwirth, and James Lovelock, the author of The Revenge of Gaia and The Vanishing Face of Gaia.

In an interview with American Public Media, Brand said, "...in [Whole Earth Catalog] I focused on individual empowerment, and in [Whole Earth Discipline] the focus is on the aggregate effects of humans on things like climate. And some of these issues are of such scale that you got to have the governments doing things like making carbon expensive. Or making coal expensive to burn and putting all that carbon into the atmosphere. And individuals can't do that, individual communities can't do that. It takes national governments."

== Synopsis ==
Speaking on "Rethinking Green", Brand provided a short version of his book:

The book challenges traditional environmentalist thinking around four major issues:

- Cities are green.
- Nuclear power is green.
- Genetic engineering is green.
- Geoengineering is probably necessary.

He summarized the book as follows:

Urbanization, or the move to cities, requires grid electricity, which chapter one discusses, in particular nuclear power. Another two chapters explain the need for genetic engineering. The fourth chapter is a "sermon" on science and large-scale geoengineering. The fifth chapter tackles restoration of natural infrastructure and benevolent ecosystem engineering. Finally, Brand concludes with humans' obligation to "learn planet craft", to enhance life and Earth like an earthworm.

== Criticism ==
Amory Lovins published a critique at the Rocky Mountain Institute, saying on NPR that nuclear energy is not the most cost-effective solution, that it is too expensive and slow to build. Jim Riccio, a spokesman for Greenpeace speaking with Green Inc. of The New York Times, called Brand's arguments "nonsensical, especially concerning the abysmal economics of nuclear power."

"(Environmentalists) are viewing what I'm saying more in sorrow than in anger," Brand told the Toronto Star.

== Online revision after publication ==
Brand maintains an online version of his book where, as he says "the text (much of it) dwells in a living thicket of its origins and implications. Instead of static footnotes there are live links to my sources, including some better ones that turned up after the writing".

He also published an online "Afterword". He asks: "What belongs in an afterword?" For one thing, he says: "history that has moved on from what I described in 2009 should be indicated" But his Afterword is also a place where he can record changes in his views: "I did promise in this book that I would change my mind as needed...."

Brand says his views on climate are influenced most by his old friend James Lovelock. In the Afterword, Brand writes that Lovelock has "softened his sense of alarm about the pace of climate change". (Lovelock's position had been that planetary catastrophe was now unavoidable). Brand explains that Lovelock changed his mind because of two things: he read a book, The Climate Caper, by Garth Paltridge, and he read a paper by Dr. Kevin Trenberth, which was published in Science. Brand quotes from an email he got from Lovelock: "Something unknown appears to be slowing down the rate of global warming".

Brand's current position on climate change is unclear. In a talk recorded in Vancouver, he told the audience "maybe nothing" will happen as a result of the accumulating greenhouse gases, although he said it would be "like playing Russian Roulette with five cylinders loaded, to not reduce emissions".

== Reviews ==
Publishers Weekly said, "Rejecting the inflexible message so common in the Green movement, he describes a process of reasonable debate and experimentation. Brand's fresh perspective, approachable writing style and manifest wisdom ultimately convince the reader that the future is not an abyss to be feared but an opportunity for innovative problem solvers to embrace enthusiastically." Library Journal's verdict: "Despite the occasional flippant comment, Brand's tough but constructive projection of our near future on this overheating planet is essential reading for all." One Energy Collective reviewer disagreed: "What's Brand doing telling people to pay attention to a second rate climate science denier like Paltridge? And that aging old friend of his who has so influenced him, Lovelock, he doesn't seem to understand what recent debate among leading climate scientists means."
