= We Are As Gods (book) =

2016 book by Kate Daloz

- Author: Kate Daloz
- Language: English
- Genre: Non-fiction
- Publication date: April 26, 2016
- Publication place: United States
- ISBN: 1610392256

We Are As Gods or the full title, We Are As Gods: Back to the Land in the 1970s on the Quest for a New America, is a nonfiction book written by historian Kate Daloz about Myrtle Hill, a back-to-the-land commune founded in the 1970s in Vermont. Daloz drew from her personal connection to the region to write this book.

== Background and content ==
Daloz was inspired to entitle the book, We Are As Gods, by the opening line from the Whole Earth Catalog which reads, "We are as gods and might as well get good at it." Myrtle Hill, the main commune depicted in the book, was founded by individuals who believed in self-sufficiency as an alternative to mainstream American life of the 1960s.

Daloz lived near the commune with her parents built a geodesic dome nearby. The book follows the community's history and highlights the daily life of living on the commune including "hippie home life" and work allocation. The book also examines broader themes such as gender roles, the family unit, and collective living arrangements. She also discusses the positive impact left by American communes on American society today. Daloz claims that the push for clean energy, natural foods, farm-to-table eating, and the movement towards drug legalization were all directly inspired by the communal movement of that era. She also asserts that communes had subtle impacts on certain innovations stating, "Every YouTube DIY tutorial, user review, and open-source code owes something to the Whole Earth Catalog's contention that our most powerful resource is connection to each other and access to tools."

== Bernie Sanders anecdote ==
We Are As Gods attracted media attention for its reference of a brief visit by Bernie Sanders to the commune during the 1970s. According to the book and subsequent reporting, Sanders was asked to leave for focusing on political discussion rather than communal chores. At the time, Myrtle Hill had an "all-are-welcome policy" for three days. After the three days, work was expected for those who wished to stay longer.

== Reception ==
The book received generally positive reviews for creating complex characters that the reader is "interested in seeing whether everything turns out well for them." However, some critics noted that the "communalists' physical and emotional experiences seem harder than they needed to be."
