= We Are As Gods (film) =

- Directed by: David Alvarado; Jason Sussberg
- Produced by: David Alvarado; Kate McLean; Jamie Meltzer; Jason Sussberg
- Starring: Stewart Brand
- Cinematography: David Alvarado
- Edited by: Annukka Lilja; Ben Sozanski
- Music by: Brian Eno
- Production company: Structure Films
- Distributed by: Greenwich Entertainment; Stripe Press
- Release date: 2 September 2021 (US)
- Running time: 94 min.
- Country: USA
- Language: English

We Are As Gods is a 2021 documentary film about freethinker Stewart Brand. Directed by David Alvarado and Jason Sussberg, the film offers a retrospective of Brand's pursuits alongside his current campaign for reversing species extinction.

The film premiered at South by Southwest, and has garnered largely positive critical attention.

== See also ==
- George Church
- Pleistocene Park
