= CoEvolution Quarterly =

American quarterly science journal

- CoEvolution Quarterly
- Editor: Stewart Brand
- Categories: Environment, Science, Politics
- Frequency: Quarterly
- Publisher: POINT Foundation
- Founded: 1974
- Final issue Number: Fall 1984; Issue #43 (became Whole Earth Review starting issue #44)
- Country: United States
- Based in: Sausalito, California
- Language: English
- Website: Official site
- ISSN: 0095-134X

CoEvolution Quarterly (1974–1985) was a journal originally edited by Stewart Brand. Brand established the CoEvolution Quarterly using proceeds from the Whole Earth Catalog. It evolved out of the original Supplement to the Whole Earth Catalog. Fred Turner notes that in 1985, Brand merged CoEvolution Quarterly with The Whole Earth Software Review (a supplement to The Whole Earth Software Catalog) to create the Whole Earth Review.

CoEvolution Quarterly was the first place to publish Ivan Illich's essays "Vernacular Values" which later became the book Shadow Work.
