= Fred Turner (author) =

American academic

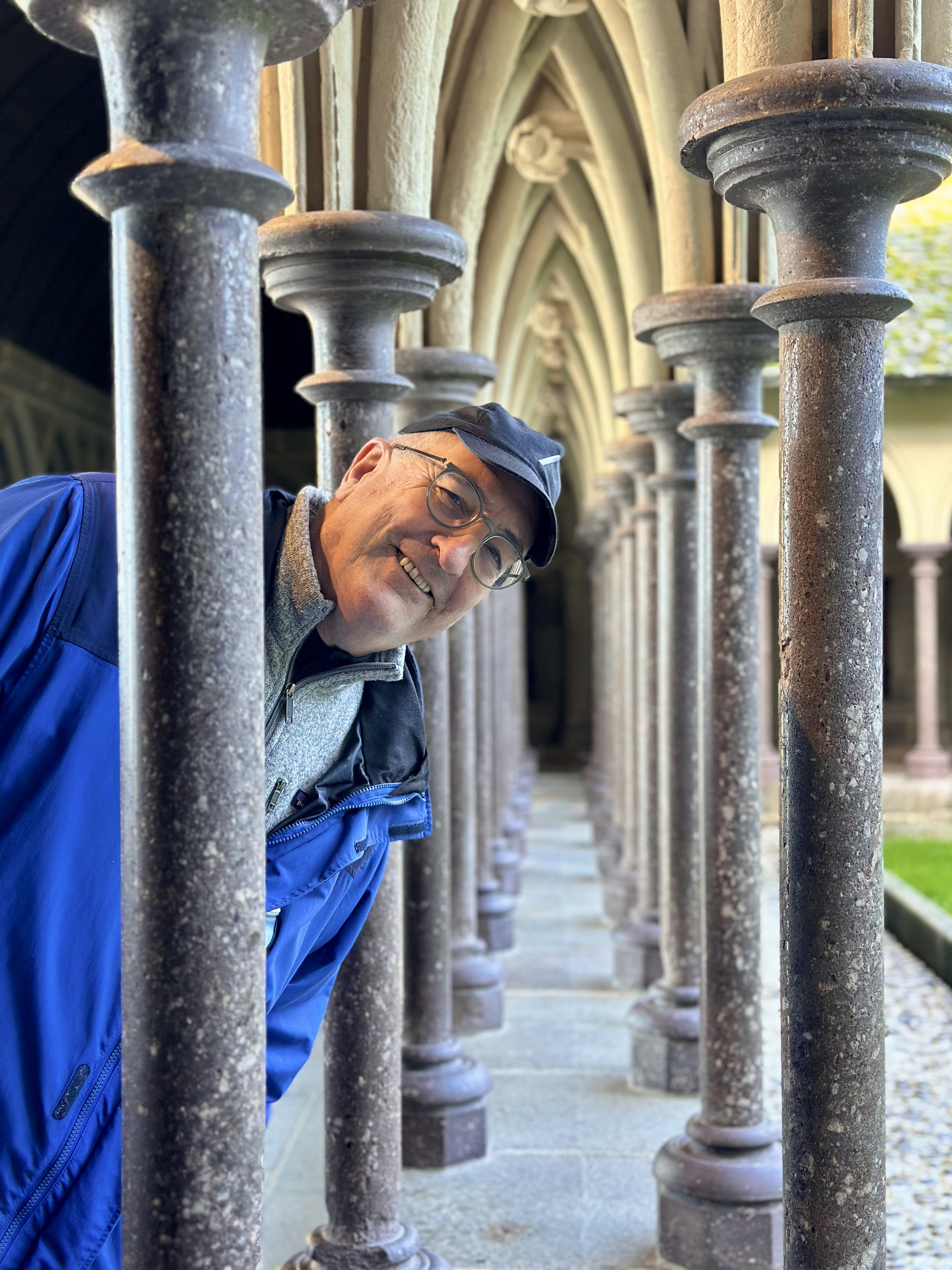
- Fred Turner in Mont-Saint-Michel (France).
- Born: April 4, 1961 (age 65)

Academic background
- Education: Brown University; Columbia University; UC San Diego

Fred Turner (born April 4, 1961) is an American academic. He is the Harry and Norman Chandler Professor of Communication at Stanford University, having formerly served as department chair.

Before joining Stanford as an associate professor, Turner taught communication at Harvard University's John F. Kennedy School of Government and the Massachusetts Institute of Technology. He earned a B.A. in English and American Literature from Brown University, an M.A. in English from Columbia University, and a Ph.D. in communication from the University of California, San Diego. In 2015, he was appointed as Harry and Norman Chandler Professor and Chair of the Department of Communication at Stanford.

Before joining academia, Turner worked as a journalist for over ten years writing for The Boston Phoenix and Boston Sunday Globe, among others.

== Bibliography ==
- Seeing Silicon Valley: Life Inside a Fraying America (2021) ISBN 9780226786483 (paper) ISBN 9780226786513 (epub) ISBN 9780226786513 (PDF)
- De l‘usage de l‘art : de Burning Man à Facebook : art, technologie et management dans la Silicon Valley (in French only) (2020) ISBN 9782376620174 (paper) ISBN 9782376620501 (epub)
- The Democratic Surround: Multimedia and American Liberalism from World War II to the Psychedelic Sixties (2013) ISBN 9780226817460
- From Counterculture to Cyberculture: Stewart Brand, the Whole Earth Network and the Rise of Digital Utopianism (2006) ISBN 9780226817415
- Echoes of Combat: Trauma, Memory, and the Vietnam War (Echoes of Combat: The Vietnam War in American Memory in 1996; revised 2nd ed. with new title 2001)
