= Peter Warshall =

Peter Warshall (1940–2013) was an ecologist, activist and essayist whose work centers on conservation and conservation-based development. He attended Camp Rising Sun in 1958 and 1959. After receiving ab A.B. in biology from Harvard in 1964, he went on to study cultural anthropology at l'École Pratique des Hautes Études in Paris with Claude Lévi-Strauss, as a Fulbright Scholar. He then returned to Harvard where he earned his Ph.D. in Biological Anthropology.

Warshall's research interests include natural history, natural resource management (especially watersheds and wastewater practices), conservation biology, biodiversity assessments, environmental impact analysis, and conflict resolution and consensus building between divergent economic and cultural special interest groups. He has worked as a consultant for the United Nations High Commission for Refugees in Ethiopia; for USAID and other organizations in ten other African nations; he has worked with the Tohono O'odham and Apache people of Arizona; and advised corporations such as Senco, Clorox, Trans Hygga, and SAS Airlines, as well as municipal governments such as the city of Malibu.

Warshall was the Sustainability and Anthropology Editor of one of the later editions of the Whole Earth Catalog series, and served as an editor of its spin-off magazine, Whole Earth Review. He has taught at the Jack Kerouac School of Disembodied Poetics at Naropa Institute.

He was elected to the board of the Bolinas Community Public Utility District.

Warshall was a member of the Global Business Network. He recently co-directed the Dreaming New Mexico project.

Peter Warshall: Squirrels on Earth and Stars Above, a collection of Warshall's lectures and essays, was published by Edition Hors-Sujet in 2024.

== Personal life ==
Warshall died in April 2013 after a four-and-a-half year struggle with cancer.
