= Point Foundation (environment) =

American nonprofit environmental organization

POINT Foundation
- Type: Nonprofit
- Founders: Stewart Brand and Dick Raymond
- Headquarters: 27 Gate Five Road, Sausalito, California, United States of America

The founding of the nonprofit POINT Foundation was the outcome of a meeting Stewart Brand and Dick Raymond convened in November 1971 in Menlo Park, California. POINT's operational location was soon shifted to Sausalito on San Francisco Bay. POINT was established for the role of distributing funds deriving from profits of the Whole Earth Catalogs to innovative and promising ventures.

The Whole Earth Catalog (WEC), was an American periodical and product catalog. The content was intended to empower readers; a user-review format was employed to introduce products in the Catalog's pages.

The POINT foundation's board members were united by concern for the natural environment. Besides Brand and Raymond, board members included Michael Phillips (financial expert, business consultant, and POINT board's first president), Bill English, who had begun work on the prototype computer mouse in 1963, and Huey Johnson, former western-regional director of the Nature Conservancy. One of POINT's first large grants, in 1972, enabled a group of environmental scientists, activists, and Native Americans to attend the United Nations Conference on the Human Environment in Stockholm. Peter Warshall, conservation biologist, watershed expert, and consultant, was among those who served on POINT's board. So was business writer and futurist Paul Hawken.

After serving for two years on the Foundation's board, in 1973 Huey Johnson developed the idea for the Trust for Public Land. Upon leaving the board, the Foundation provided Johnson some initial funds toward establishing the Trust. The first focus of the Trust was on urban and suburban parks, then on conserving agricultural land.

Besides distributing funds, POINT took over publication of the WEC from its original publisher, the Portola Institute by 1980, when the publication had swelled to a 452-page edition. As well, the foundation published a number of mostly periodical offshoots of the WEC. POINT was also a co-owner of an early online discussion platform titled The WELL.

POINT Foundation records covering 1968–1998 were donated by foundation president Danica Remy in 2014 to the online archive of the California Digital Library.
