= Stewart Brand =

American project developer (born 1938)

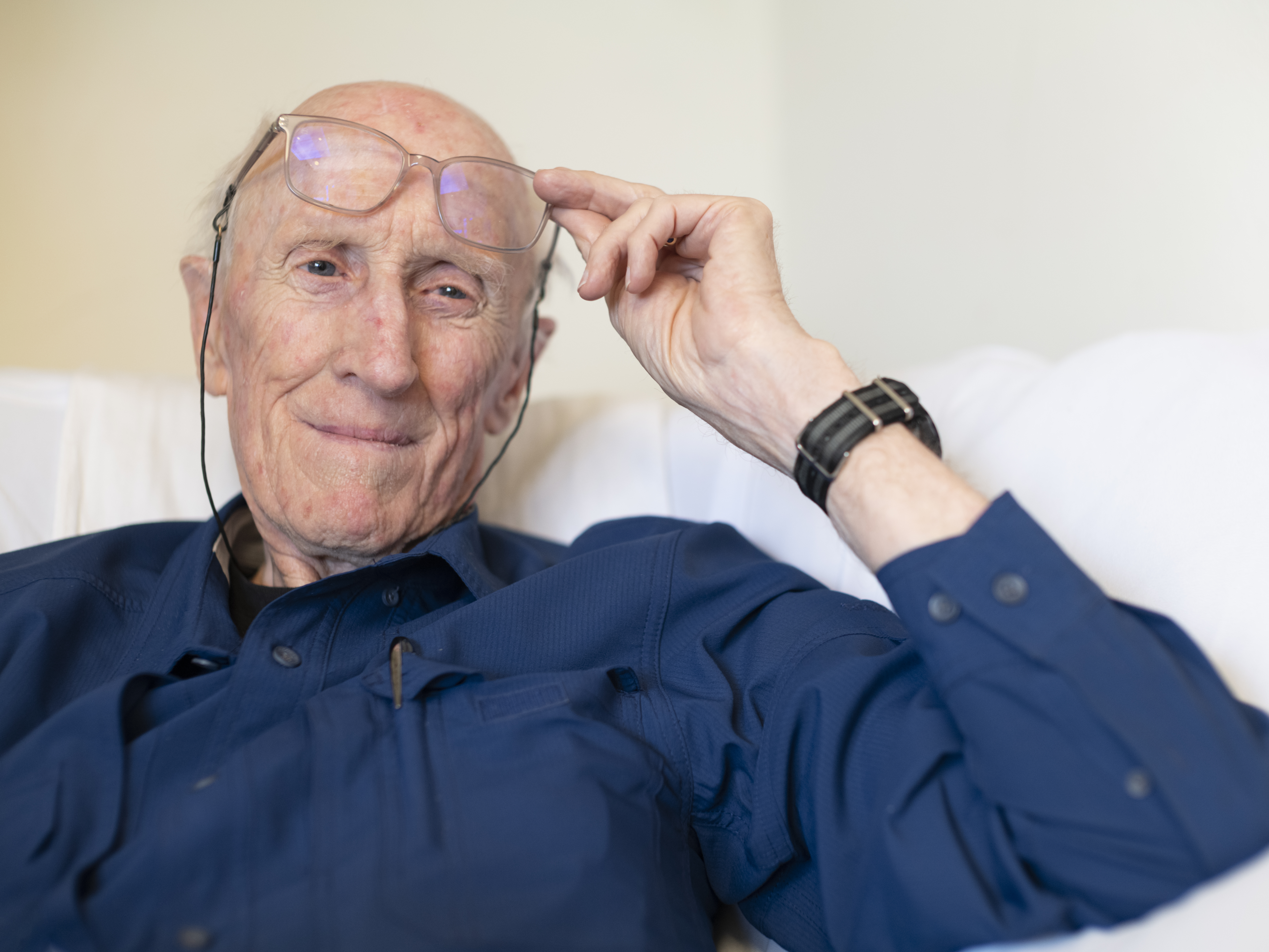
- Brand in 2020
- Born: December 14, 1938 (age 87); Rockford, Illinois, United States
- Education: Stanford University
- Occupations: Writer; editor; entrepreneur
- Known for: Whole Earth Catalog; The WELL; Long Now Foundation
- Spouse(s): Lois Jennings (1966–1973); Ryan Phelan (1983–present)
- Website: sb.longnow.org

Stewart Brand (born December 14, 1938) is an American project developer and writer, best known as the co-founder and editor of the Whole Earth Catalog. Other organizations he has founded include the WELL, the Global Business Network, and the Long Now Foundation. He is the author of several books, most recently Whole Earth Discipline: An Ecopragmatist Manifesto and Maintenance: Of Everything.

== Life ==
Brand was born in Rockford, Illinois, and attended Phillips Exeter Academy in New Hampshire. He studied biology at Stanford University under Paul R. Ehrlich, graduating in 1960. As a soldier in the U.S. Army, he was a parachutist and taught infantry skills; he later expressed the view that his experience in the military had fostered his competence in organizing.

A civilian again in 1962, he moved back to California, where he has mostly lived since. He studied design at San Francisco Art Institute, photography at San Francisco State College, and participated in a scientific study of then-legal LSD with Myron Stolaroff's International Foundation for Advanced Study, in Menlo Park, California.

Brand became acquainted with Richard Raymond, a land-use and community-development expert turned entrepreneur, who had established a nonprofit society, the Portola Institute in Menlo Park. Raymond had become a consultant to the Warm Springs Indian Reservation and recommended Brand for a job there as a photographer.

In 1966, Brand married the mathematician Lois Jennings, a half-Odawa Native American. The couple divorced in 1973.

Brand met Ryan Phelan when she applied for a job to work at Whole Earth Catalog, and the two married in 1983. The couple lives on Mirene, a 64-foot (20 m)-long working tugboat. Built in 1912, the boat is moored in a former shipyard in Sausalito, California. He works in Mary Heartline, a grounded fishing boat about 100 yards (90 metres) away. One of his favorite items is a table on which Otis Redding is said to have written "(Sittin' On) The Dock of the Bay", a furnishing that Brand acquired from an antiques dealer in Sausalito.

== USCO and Merry Pranksters ==
By the mid-1960s, Brand became associated with New York multimedia group USCO and Bay Area author Ken Kesey and his Merry Pranksters. Brand co-produced the 1966 Trips Festival, an early effort blending rock music and light shows, with Kesey and Ramón Sender Barayón. The Trips Festival was among the first Grateful Dead performances in San Francisco. An estimated 10,000 hippies attended, and Haight-Ashbury soon emerged as the epicenter of an emerging counterculture, with the Summer of Love in 1967. Tom Wolfe includes Brand in his 1968 book The Electric Kool-Aid Acid Test.

== NASA images of Earth ==
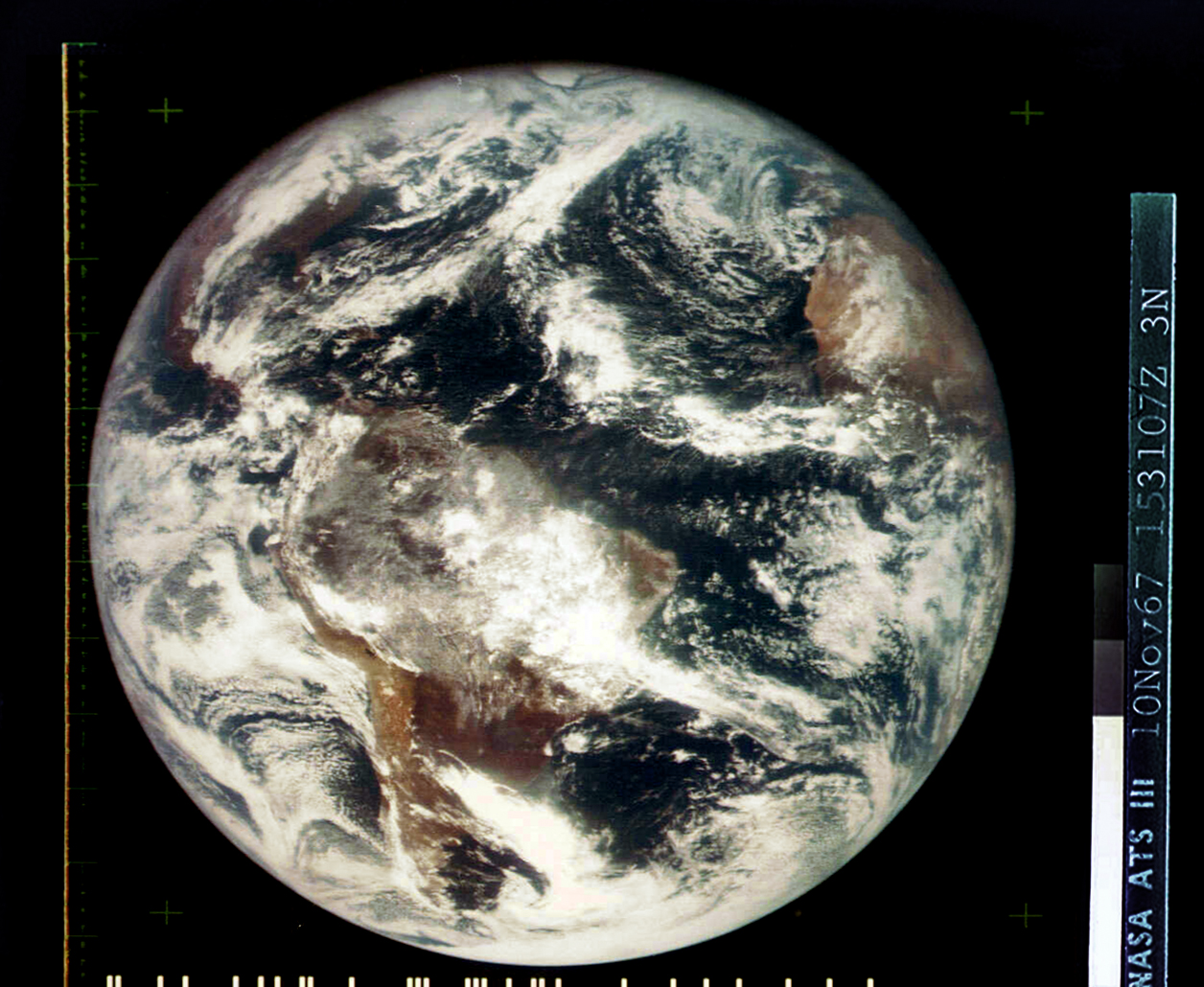
Earth from space, by ATS-3 satellite, 1967

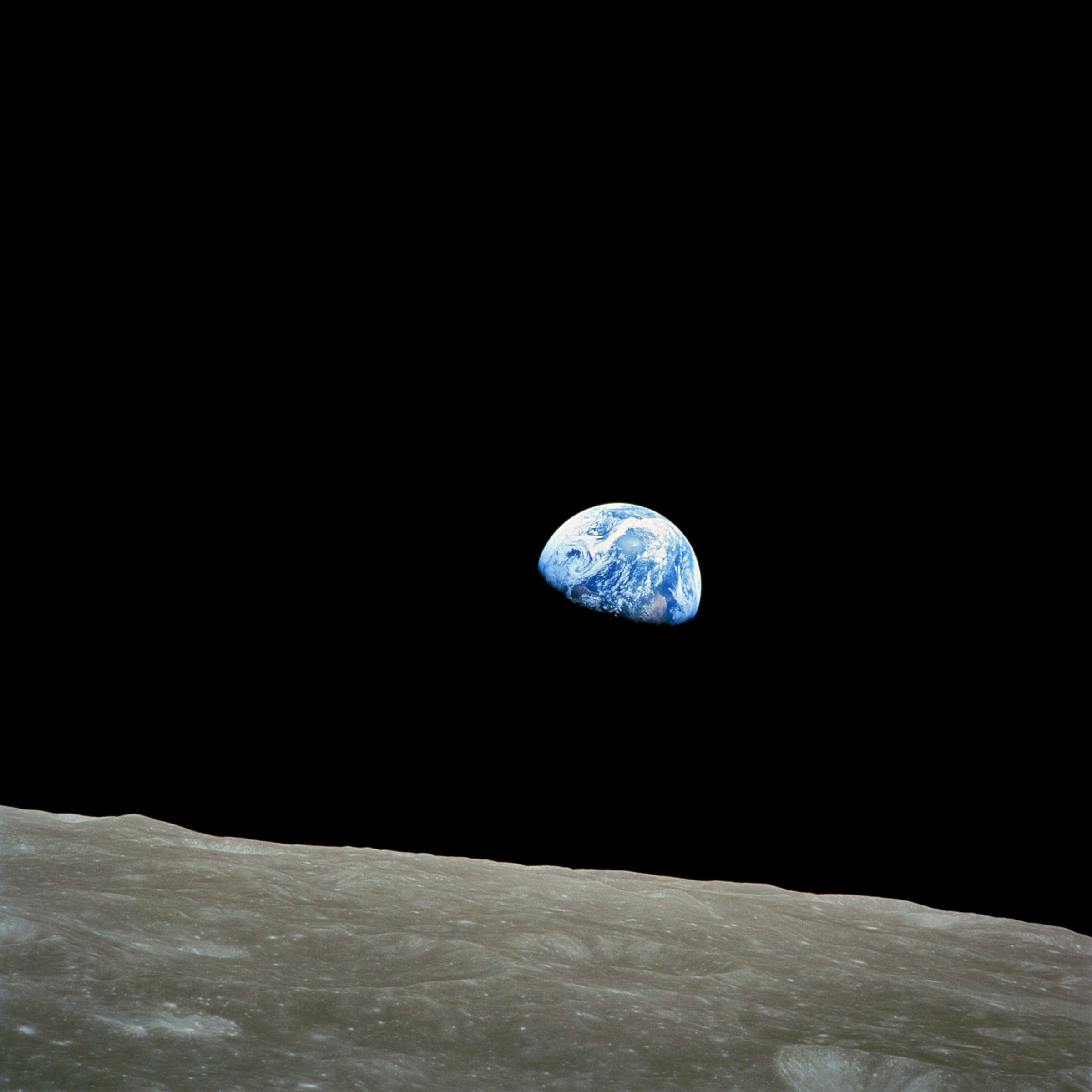
Earthrise, by William Anders, Apollo 8, 1968

In 1966, while on an LSD trip on the roof of his house in North Beach, San Francisco, Brand became convinced that seeing an image of the whole Earth would change how we think about the planet and ourselves. He then campaigned to have NASA release the then-rumored satellite image of the entire Earth as seen from space. He sold and distributed buttons for 25 cents each, asking, "Why haven't we seen a photograph of the whole Earth yet?" During this campaign, Brand met Richard Buckminster Fuller, who offered to help Brand with his projects.

In 1967, the ATS-3 satellite took the photo Brand had envisioned. He thought the image of our planet would be a powerful symbol and featured it on the first (fall 1968) edition of the Whole Earth Catalog. Later in 1968, NASA astronaut Bill Anders took an Earth photo, Earthrise, from Moon orbit, which became the front image of the spring 1969 edition of the Catalog. 1970 saw the first celebration of Earth Day.

== Douglas Engelbart ==
In late 1968, Brand assisted electrical engineer Douglas Engelbart with the Mother of All Demos, a presentation of many revolutionary computer technologies (including hypertext, email, and the mouse) to the Fall Joint Computer Conference in San Francisco.

Brand surmised that given the necessary consciousness, information, and tools, human beings could reshape the world they had made (and were making) for themselves into something environmentally and socially sustainable.

== Whole Earth Catalog ==
During the late 1960s and early 1970s, about 10 million Americans were involved in living communally. In 1968, using the most basic approaches to typesetting and page layout, Brand and his colleagues created issue number one of the Whole Earth Catalog, with the subtitle "access to tools". The Portola Institute provided financial support for Brand's brainchild. Until 1980, editions of the Whole Earth Catalog were published by the Portola Institute. Brand and his wife, Lois, traveled to communes in a 1963 Dodge truck known as the Whole Earth Truck Store, which (as a division of the Portola Institute) moved to a storefront in Menlo Park, California.

The first oversized Catalog, and its successors from the 1970s to the last issue (in 1994), included a wide assortment of things that could serve as useful "tools": books, maps, garden implements, specialized clothing, carpenters' and masons' tools, forestry gear, tents, welding equipment, professional journals, early synthesizers, and personal computers. It also comprised ideas, stories, examples of successful projects, mentors like Buckminster Fuller, and the experiences of many pioneers. The catalog anticipated social media by reflecting its readers' contemporary experiences in the world. Brand invited "reviews" (written in the form of a letter to a friend) of the best of these items from experts in specific fields or from ordinary people with experience. The catalog described where these things could be located or purchased, if they could be, or how they could be created. Its publication coincided with the wave of social and cultural experimentation, convention-breaking, and "do it yourself" attitude associated with the counterculture.

The Whole Earth Catalog had widespread influence within the rural back-to-the-land movement of the 1970s, and the communities movement within many cities throughout the United States, Canada, and Australia. The 1972 edition sold 1.5 million copies, winning the first U.S. National Book Award in the Contemporary Affairs category.

Steve Jobs ended his 2005 commencement address at Stanford University by acknowledging both Stewart Brand and the Whole Earth Catalog, quoting its farewell message: "Stay hungry. Stay foolish".

== CoEvolution Quarterly ==
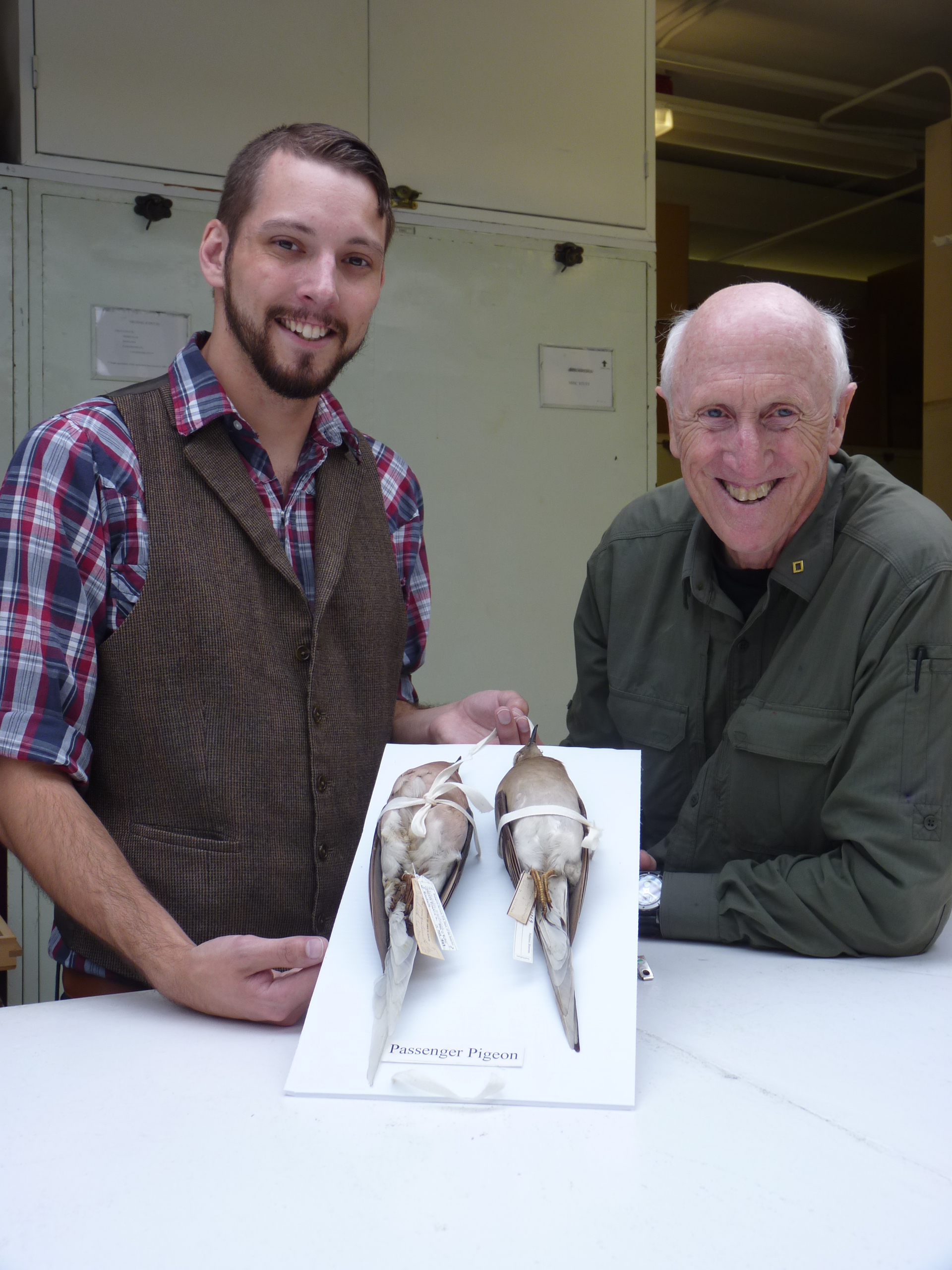
Brand with passenger pigeon study skins

To continue his work and also to publish full-length articles on specific topics in the natural sciences and invention, in numerous areas of the arts and the social sciences, and on the contemporary scene in general, Brand founded CoEvolution Quarterly in 1974, aimed primarily at educated laypeople. Brand never better revealed his opinions and reason for hope than when he ran, in CoEvolution Quarterly #4, a transcription of technology historian Lewis Mumford's talk "The Next Transformation of Man", in which he stated that "man has still within him sufficient resources to alter the direction of modern civilization, for we then need no longer regard man as the passive victim of his own irreversible technological development".

The content of CoEvolution Quarterly often included futurism or risqué topics. Besides giving space to unknown writers with something to say, Brand presented articles by many respected authors and thinkers, including Mumford, Howard T. Odum, Witold Rybczynski, Karl Hess, Orville Schell, Ivan Illich, Wendell Berry, Ursula K. Le Guin, Gregory Bateson, Amory Lovins, Hazel Henderson, Gary Snyder, Lynn Margulis, Eric Drexler, Gerard K. O'Neill, Peter Calthorpe, Sim Van der Ryn, Paul Hawken, John Todd, Kevin Kelly, and Donella Meadows. In the ensuing years, Brand authored and edited a number of books on topics as diverse as computer-based media, the life history of buildings, and ideas about space colonies.

In 1984, Brand founded the Whole Earth Software Review, a supplement to the Whole Earth Software Catalog. It was merged with CoEvolution Quarterly to form the Whole Earth Review in 1985.

== California government ==
From 1977 to 1979, Brand served as "special advisor" to the administration of California Governor Jerry Brown.

== The WELL ==
In 1985, Brand and Larry Brilliant founded the WELL ("Whole Earth 'Lectronic Link"), a prototypical, wide-ranging online community for informed participants the world over. The WELL won the 1990 Best Online Publication Award from the Computer Press Association.

== All Species Foundation ==
In 2000, Brand helped launch the All Species Foundation, which aimed to catalog all species of life on Earth. The project ceased functioning in 2007, transferring its mission to the Encyclopedia of Life.

== Global Business Network ==
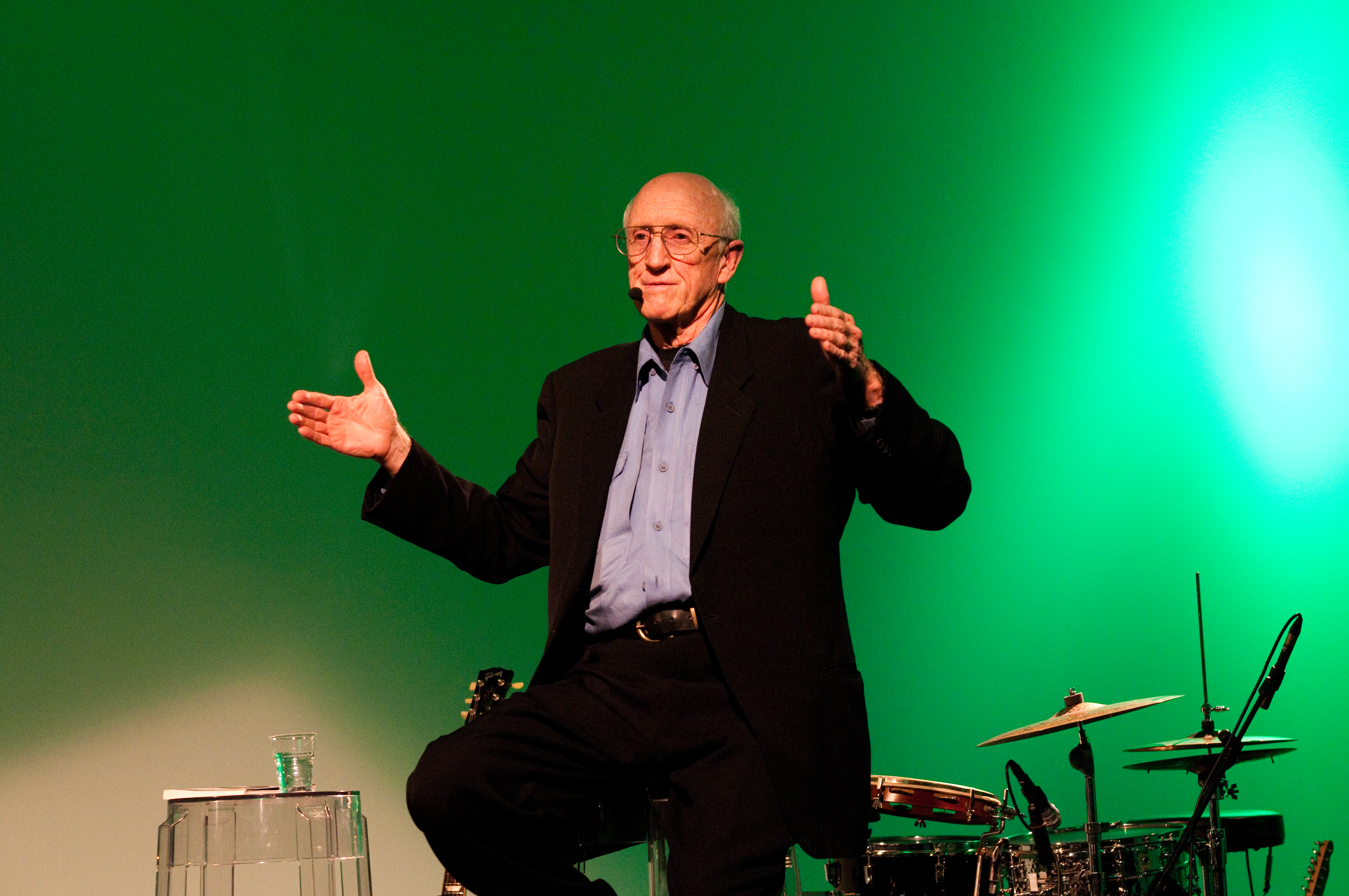
Brand speaking at the Frontiers Conference, 2010

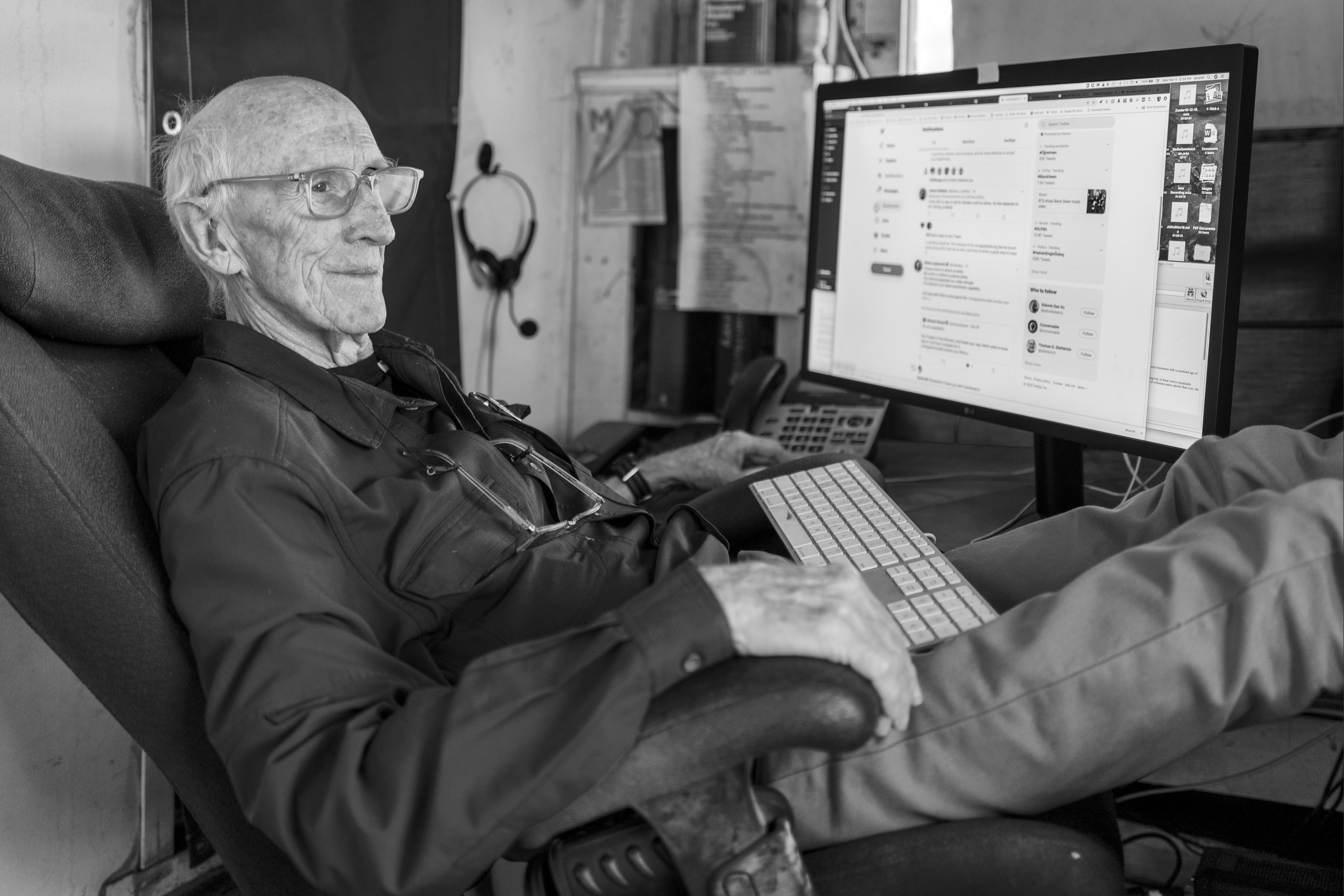
Brand in 2020

During 1986, Brand was a visiting scientist at the MIT Media Lab. Soon after, he became a private-conference organizer for such corporations as Royal Dutch Shell, Volvo, and AT&T. In 1988, he became a co‑founder of the Global Business Network, which became involved with the evolution and application of scenario thinking, planning, and complementary strategic tools. For fourteen years, Brand was on the board of the Santa Fe Institute (founded in 1984), an organization devoted to "fostering a multidisciplinary scientific research community pursuing frontier science". He has also continued to promote the preservation of tracts of wilderness.

== Whole Earth Discipline ==
The Whole Earth Catalog implied an ideal of human progress that depended on decentralized, personal, and liberating technological development—so‑called "soft technology". However, in 2005, Brand criticized aspects of the international environmental ideology he had helped to develop. He wrote an article called "Environmental Heresies" in the May 2005 issue of the MIT Technology Review, in which he described what he considered necessary changes to environmentalism. He suggested, among other things, that environmentalists embrace nuclear power and genetically modified organisms as technologies with more promise than risk.

Brand later developed these ideas into a book and published Whole Earth Discipline: An Ecopragmatist Manifesto in 2009. The book examines how urbanization, nuclear power, genetic engineering, geoengineering, and wildlife restoration can be used as powerful tools in humanity's ongoing fight against global warming.

In a 2019 interview, Brand described his perspective as "post-libertarian", indicating that at the time when the Whole Earth Catalog was being written, he did not fully understand the significance of the role of government in the development of technology and engineering. In his environmental position, he self-describes as an "eco-pragmatist".

== Long Now Foundation ==
Brand is co‑chair and president of the board of directors of the Long Now Foundation and chairs the foundation's Seminars About Long-term Thinking. This series on long-term thinking has presented a range of speakers, including Brian Eno, Neal Stephenson, Vernor Vinge, Philip Rosedale, Jimmy Wales, Kevin Kelly, Clay Shirky, Ray Kurzweil, Bruce Sterling, and Cory Doctorow. The Long Now Foundation has worked with Jeff Bezos to build the 10,000 Year Clock.

Brand is the subject of the 2021 documentary film We Are As Gods.

== Works ==
Stewart Brand is the initiator or was involved with the development of the following:

- Whole Earth Catalog in 1968
- CoEvolution Quarterly in 1974
- Whole Earth Software Catalog and Review in 1984
- Whole Earth Review in 1985
- Point Foundation
- Global Business Network (co-founder)
- The WELL in 1985, with Larry Brilliant
- The Hackers Conference in 1984
- Long Now Foundation in 1996, with computer scientist Danny Hillis—one of the foundation's projects is to build a 10,000 year clock, the Clock of the Long Now
- New Games Tournament (was involved initially but left the project)
- In April 2015, Brand joined with a group of scholars in issuing An Ecomodernist Manifesto. The other authors included: Barry Brook, Ruth DeFries, Erle Ellis, David Keith, Mark Lynas, Ted Nordhaus, Roger A. Pielke Jr., Michael Shellenberger, and Robert Stone.

== Publications ==
=== Books ===
- II Cybernetic Frontiers, 1974, ISBN 0-394-49283-8 (hardcover), ISBN 0-394-70689-7 (paperback)
- The Media Lab: Inventing the Future at MIT, 1987, ISBN 0-670-81442-3 (hardcover); 1988, ISBN 0-14-009701-5 (paperback)
- How Buildings Learn: What Happens After They're Built, 1994. ISBN 0-670-83515-3
- The Clock of the Long Now: Time and Responsibility, 1999. ISBN 0-465-04512-X
- Whole Earth Discipline: An Ecopragmatist Manifesto, Viking Adult, 2009. ISBN 0-670-02121-0
- The Salt Summaries: Seminars About Long-term Thinking, Long Now Press, 2011. ISBN 978-1-105-75187-5 (paperback)
- Maintenance: Of Everything, Stripe Press, 2025. ISBN 978-1-953953-51-3

=== Editor or co-editor ===
- Whole Earth Catalog, original editor, 1968–1972 – winner of the National Book Award, 1972
- Last Whole Earth Catalog: Access to Tools, 1971
- Whole Earth Epilog: Access to Tools, 1974, ISBN 0-14-003950-3
- The (Updated) Last Whole Earth Catalog: Access to Tools, 16th edition, 1975, ISBN 0-14-003544-3
- Space Colonies, Whole Earth Catalog, 1977, ISBN 0-14-004805-7
- Soft-Tech, co-editor with J. Baldwin, 1978, ISBN 0-14-004806-5
- The Next Whole Earth Catalog: Access to Tools, 1980, ISBN 0-394-73951-5
- The Next Whole Earth Catalog: Access to Tools, revised 2nd edition, 1981, ISBN 0-394-70776-1
- Whole Earth Software Catalog, editor-in-chief, 1984, ISBN 0-385-19166-9
- Whole Earth Software Catalog for 1986, editor-in-chief, 1985, ISBN 0-385-23301-9 – "2.0 edition" of above title
- News That Stayed News, 1974–1984: Ten Years of CoEvolution Quarterly, co-editor with Art Kleiner, 1986, ISBN 0-86547-201-7 (hardcover), ISBN 0-86547-202-5 (paperback)

=== Contributor ===
- The Essential Whole Earth Catalog: Access to Tools and Ideas, 1986, ISBN 0-385-23641-7 – introduction
- Signal: Communication Tools for the Information Age, edited by Kevin Kelly, 1988, ISBN 0-517-57084-X – foreword
- The Fringes of Reason: A Whole Earth Catalog, edited by Ted Schultz, 1989, ISBN 0-517-57165-X – foreword
- Whole Earth Ecolog: The Best of Environmental Tools & Ideas, edited by J. Baldwin, 1990, ISBN 0-517-57658-9 – foreword

== See also ==
- Bright green environmentalism
