= Khan Shatyr Entertainment Center =

Shopping centre

- View of Khan Shatyr Entertainment Center, the highest tensile structure in the world
- Interactive map of the Khan Shatyr Entertainment Center area

General information
- Status: Completed
- Type: Mall
- Location: Astana, Kazakhstan
- Coordinates: 51°7′56″N 71°24′14″E
- Construction started: December 2006
- Completed: July 2010
- Opening: 5 July 2010
- Cost: US$400,000,000
- Owner: Sembol Construction

Height
- Antenna spire: 150 m (490 ft)
- Roof: 90 m (300 ft)

Technical details
- Floor area: 100,000 m^{2} (1,100,000 sq ft)

Design and construction
- Architect: Foster and Partners
- Engineer: Selami Gürel; Vector Foiltec (climate shell)
- Structural engineer: Buro Happold

Khan Shatyr (Kazakh: Хан Шатыр, romanized: Han Şatyr, lit. 'Grand Marquee') is a transparent tent-shaped Entertainment Center located in Astana, the capital city of Kazakhstan. Built in a neo-futurist style, the architectural project was unveiled by the first President of Kazakhstan Nursultan Nazarbayev on December 9, 2006.

The 90-metre (300 ft) high tent (150 m (490 ft) including the spire) has a 200-by-195-metre (656 ft × 640 ft) elliptical base covering 140,000 square metres (14 ha; 35 acres). Under the tent, an area larger than 10 football fields, is an urban-scale park, shopping and entertainment venue with squares and cobbled streets, a boating river, shopping centre, minigolf and indoor beach resort. The fabric roof is constructed from ETFE-cushions provided by Vector Foiltec, suspended on a network of cables strung from a central spire. The transparent material allows sunlight through which, in conjunction with the stack effect, air heating and cooling systems, is designed to maintain an internal temperature between 15–30 °C (59–86 °F) in the main space and 19–24 °C (66–75 °F) in the retail units, while outside the temperature varies between −35 and 35 °C (−31 and 95 °F) across the year.

Following the construction of the Palace of Peace and Reconciliation (opened in 2006), a glass pyramid, the Khan Shatyr Entertainment Center was the second national project in Astana designed by UK architect Norman Foster (of Foster and Partners), (Partners in Charge Filo Russo and Peter Ridley), and UK engineers Buro Happold led by Mike Cook. Aldar Properties was a partner in the development. Construction documentation architects were Linea and Gultekin. The construction of the tent-city was the responsibility of the Turkish company Sembol.

After a series of delays, the main mast was eventually erected in December 2008, and the whole complex was completed and opened on July 5, 2010, 70th birthday of Kazakhstan's president, Nursultan Nazarbayev. Andrea Bocelli gave a concert for the occasion, with guests including the President of Russia, Dmitry Medvedev; the President of Ukraine, Viktor Yanukovych; the President of Turkey, Abdullah Gül; the President of Belarus, Alexander Lukashenko; the President of Armenia, Serzh Sargsyan; the President of Tajikistan, Emomalii Rahmon; the President of Kyrgyzstan, Roza Otunbayeva; the Crown prince of Abu Dhabi, Mohammed bin Zayed Al Nahyan; and the King of Jordan, Abdullah II.
