= James T. Baldwin =

American industrial designer and writer (1933–2018)

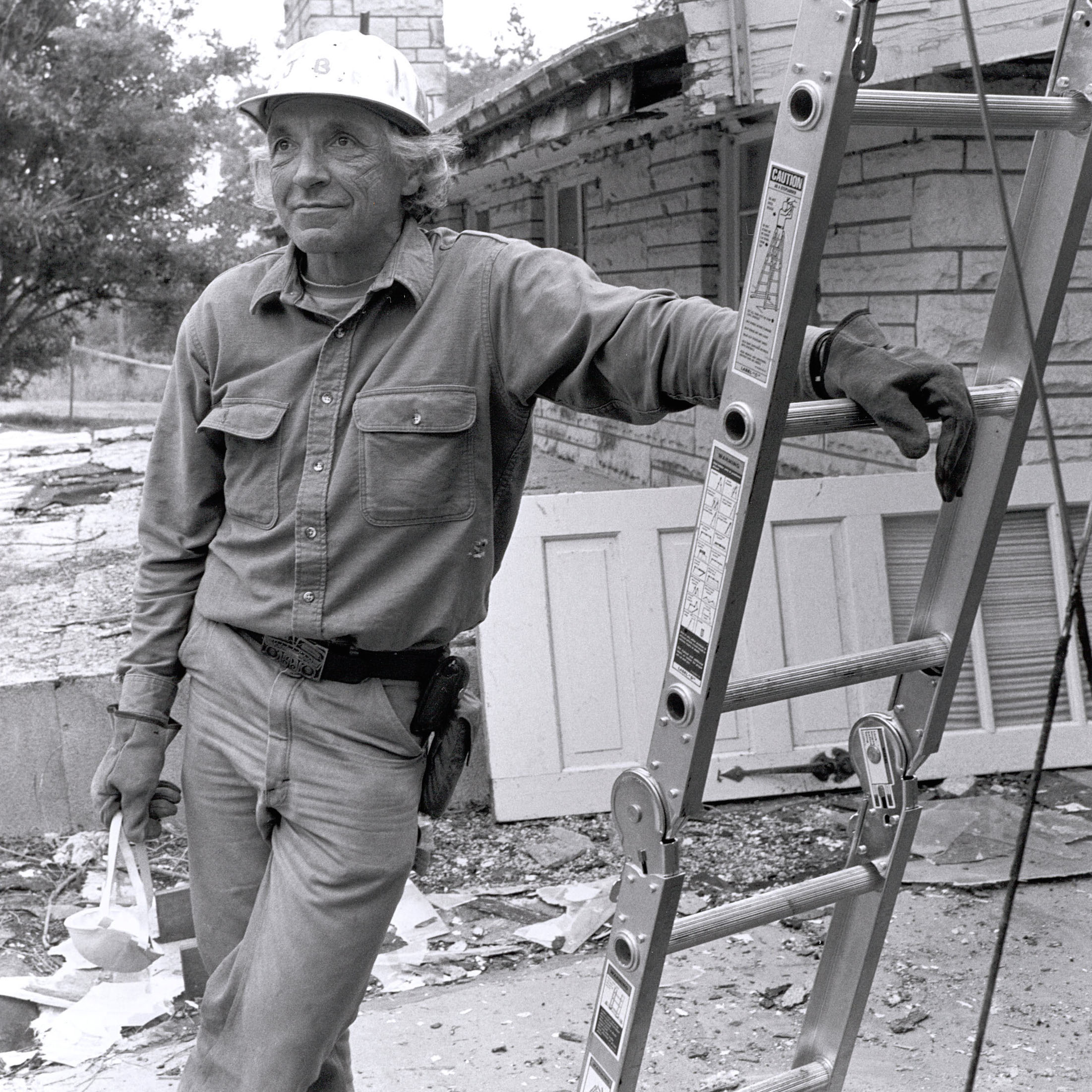
- Jay Baldwin was acting team leader during the dismantling of Fuller's Dymaxion House (near Wichita, Kansas) prior to its being moved, preserved, and restored at the Henry Ford Museum, near Detroit.
- Born: James Tennant Baldwin; May 6, 1933
- Died: March 2, 2018 (aged 84)
- Education: University of Michigan
- Occupations: Industrial designer, writer, post-secondary instructor
- Writing career
- Pen name: J. Baldwin or Jay Baldwin
- Notable work: Inventor of the "Pillow Dome"

James Tennant Baldwin (May 6, 1933 – March 2, 2018), often known as Jay Baldwin or J. Baldwin, was an American industrial designer and writer. Baldwin was a student of Buckminster Fuller; Baldwin's work was inspired by Fuller's principles and, in the case of some of Baldwin's published writings, he popularized and interpreted Fuller's ideas and achievements. In his own right, Baldwin was a figure in American designers' efforts to incorporate solar, wind, and other renewable energy sources. He experimented and pioneered in such diverse areas as integrated renewable energy systems for homes, cold-climate greenhouse food production systems, and advanced automobile design. During his career, being a fabricator was as important as being a designer. Baldwin documented his work, and he taught from his experience at the college and university levels.

Baldwin was noted as the inventor of the "Pillow Dome", a design that combines Buckminster Fuller's geodesic dome with panels of inflated ETFE plastic panels.

== Early life, work and teaching ==
J. Baldwin, born the son of an engineer, once said that, at 18, he heard Buckminster Fuller speak for 14 hours non-stop. This was at the University of Michigan, where Baldwin had enrolled to learn automobile design because a friend of his had been killed in a car accident that Baldwin attributed to bad design. Fuller had, at that time (1951) just designed the world's second-largest dome, which was installed on a building at the Ford Motor Company offices. Influenced by Fuller, Baldwin came to feel that most designers were, unfortunately, not aware that design should take into account the full relationship between the thing designed and the human and natural-world environment. Baldwin worked with Fuller prior to graduation from U. of M. in 1955.

During his student years, Baldwin worked (in a unique job sharing role) in an auto factory assembly line. He went on to do graduate work at the University of California, Berkeley.

Baldwin remained a friend of Buckminster Fuller, and reflected that "By example, he encouraged me to think for myself comprehensively, to be disciplined, to work for the good of everyone, and to have a good time doing it."

As an avid outdoorsman, and young designer, in the late 1950s and early '60s Baldwin designed advanced camping equipment with Bill Moss Associates. Baldwin became an instructor who passed on his knowledge and design perspective. In March 1969, accompanied by a number of his design-school students from Southern Illinois University, Baldwin was a participant in the Alloy conference that took place near La Luz, New Mexico. The conference, convened by Steve Baer and fiends, had attracted people from across the U.S. and from Canada. In the early 1970s, Baldwin taught at Pacific High School, and later taught simultaneously at San Francisco State College (now called San Francisco State University), San Francisco Art Institute, and the Oakland campus of California College of Arts & Crafts for about six years.

The period 1968-69 found him both a visiting lecturer at Southern Illinois University and the design editor of the innovative Whole Earth Catalog. The Catalog came out in many editions between 1968 and 1998, and Baldwin continued to edit and write for both the Catalog and an offshoot publication, CoEvolution Quarterly, later renamed Whole Earth Review.

== Ongoing work: eco-technology design and development ==
Baldwin was at the center of experimentation with geodesic domes, an unconventional building-design approach – explored by Fuller – that maximizes strength and covered area in relation to materials used. Baldwin's initial involvement with solar energy was during that very experimental, ad-lib phase when much was moving from principles or theory into actual development He worked closely with Dr. John Todd and the other New Alchemists involved with "The Ark" project in Cape Cod. Here he pioneered a type of integrated greenhouse, proving that a kind of indoor farming was possible in a cold-winter climate: he designed and tested a system for raising vegetables, protein (fresh-water fish raised in tanks), and even bananas, indoors in winter. Baldwin dove enthusiastically into the application of renewable energy sources in homes, as well, working with Integrated Life Support Systems Laboratories (ILS, in New Mexico).In the 1970s, at ILS, he was the co-developer of what was touted as the world's first building to be heated and otherwise powered by solar and wind power exclusively.

At Prince Edward Island, Baldwin perfected his greenhouse design: successfully maintaining banana trees. He used several water tanks filled with tilapia, as a source of natural fertilizer for his hydroponics system. His greenhouse included a volume of compost for the production of heat, which was recirculated by ceiling fans. All of these are now the staples for the components of modern greenhouse construction design.

Baldwin built upon Fuller's ideas and methods, but benefited from advantages in materials development and ecological science. He referred to his own rural home as "a three-dimensional sketchpad".

During the first Jerry Brown administration, Baldwin worked in the California Office of Appropriate Technology. After the 1970s, Baldwin continued to work as a designer in association with numerous organizations and projects. He organized for himself a mobile design studio and machine workshop (in a van pulling an Airstream trailer), to drive to various projects across America.

With the ears of a wider audience in the 1980s, Baldwin developed an incisive critique of the American automobile industry, which he viewed as over-focused on superficial marketing concerns and farcically under-concerned with real innovation and improvement. He was also a constructive critic of the emerging industries manufacturing "soft technology" equipment, like wind turbines.

In the 1990s, Baldwin worked with the Rocky Mountain Institute (then located in Snowmass, Colorado), in the research, design, and development of the ultralight, ultra-efficient "Hypercar" – a prototype by way of which independent designers hoped to show the way for the world's auto manufacturers. With conceptual development having begun in 1991, one version of the Hypercar used a small generator to power an electric motor in each wheel. The design and engineering concepts of the Hypercar have not gone unheeded by major automobile manufacturers. As asserted by Amory Lovins in the Solutions Journal:

We open-sourced our industry-validated Hypercar R&D to maximize competition, then supported seven automakers’ transitions via technical and strategic engagement. Our interventions sped Japan’s hybrid-car development and helped trigger the global industry’s revolutions in lightweighting and electrification. (An early example, the 124-mpg carbon-fiber electric car drive, is already profitable for BMW.)

Given his long-term role as a "technology" editor, it is worth mentioning the scope of Baldwin's focus on technology. His interests remained broader than that represented in the shifting media and popular focus of the mid-1980s and later, which inclined to highlight the micro chip and electronic devices based on it. Baldwin continued to point out the value of (and need for evaluation of) technologies within a larger perimeter. Certainly shelter and transportation technologies always interested him. So did tools – and whether a device or tool or process was freshly innovative or age-old in concept, if it enabled a person to "do the job" with wood, metal, fiberglass panels, soil, trees, etc., it remained worthy of Baldwin's attention. Whereas the personal computer often (though not necessarily) inclines its operator toward imagination, almost in the sense of entertainment, Baldwin remained equally interested in doing, in application. And while he never ceased to be interested in the products of the factory, Baldwin always wanted to empower individuals and small teams of people to accomplish something worthwhile.

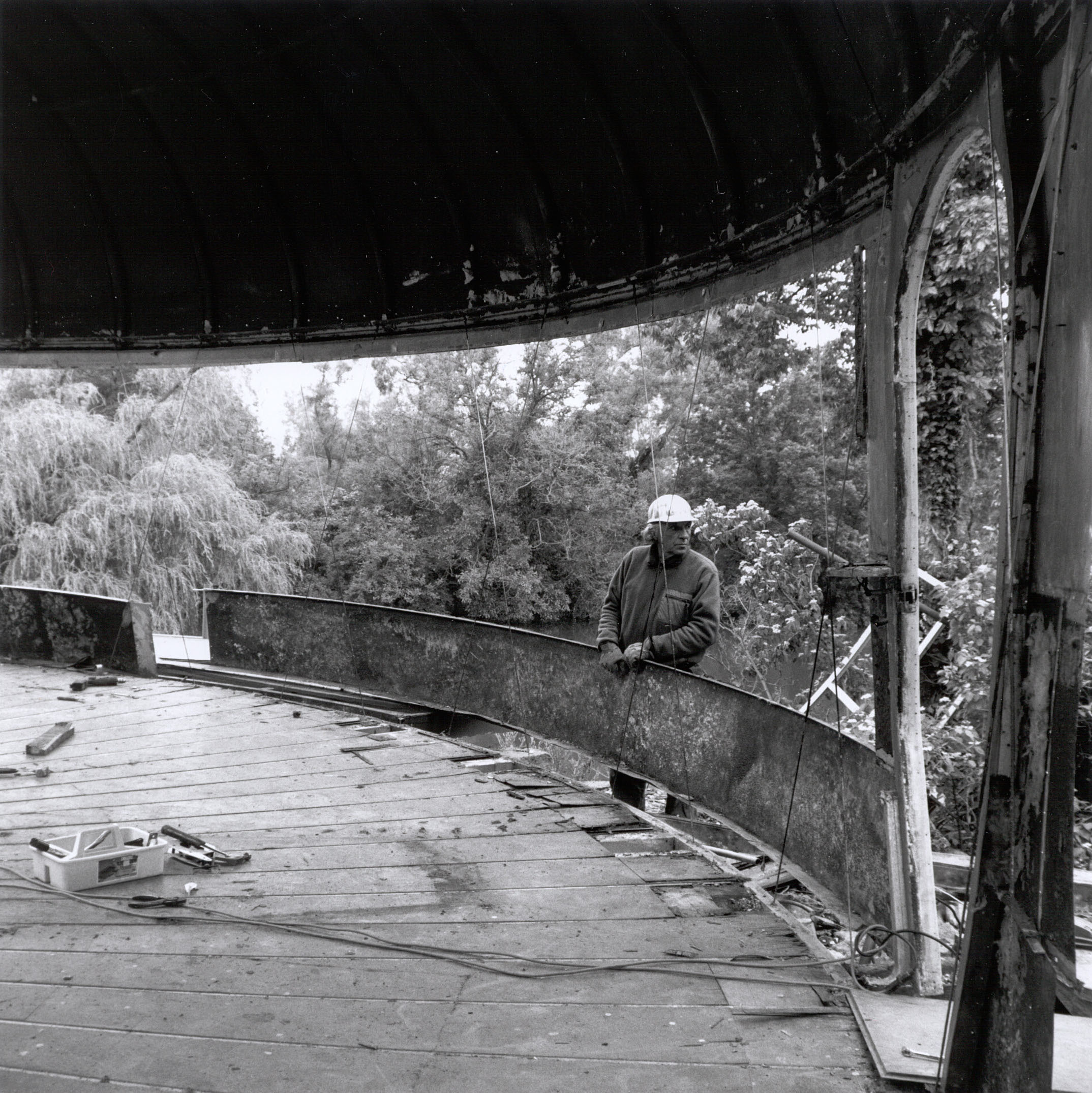
Jay is seen here removing a lower perimeter wall section of the Dymaxion House, demonstrating a Fuller principle that any part of the Dymaxion Dwelling Machine can be manipulated by a single person.

Baldwin, as one of the notable designer-technologists whose cross-disciplinary approaches have opened new territory, was featured in the 1994 documentary film Ecological Design: Inventing the Future. The film viewed these designers as "outlaws" whose careers had necessarily developed "outside the box" of their time, largely unsupported by mainstream industry and often beyond the pale of mainstream academia, as well.

Baldwin invented a permanent, transparent, insulated geodesic dome – using a framework of aluminum tubing, covered with argon-filled laminated vinyl sheet "pillows" – which he dubbed the "Pillow Dome", said to have withstood 135-mph winds and thirty inches of snow. The structure weighed just one-half pound per square foot of floor space. For a variety of reasons including durability and toxicity concerns from vinyl chloride vapor emitted by vinyl sheeting, Baldwin later recommended the use of ETFE film; ETFE had further advantages including transparency and ease of keeping the surface clean, but its ultraviolet transparency reduces its suitability for occupied structures. Baldwin intentionally did not patent his invention. The basic approach has since been applied in large-scale applications such as the Eden Project in Cornwall, England.

Baldwin continued to practice design (as exemplified in the unique and aerodynamic 'mobile-room' Quick-Up camper he put on the market) and to teach design at the college level up until 2016. Between the early 1990s and 2016 he taught at Sonoma State University, San Francisco Institute of Architecture, and at California College of Arts & Crafts.

== Death ==
Baldwin died on March 2, 2018, at the age of 84.

== Books ==
- Author: Why You Can't Fly, 2015, ISBN 9781516863273.
- Author: BuckyWorks: Buckminster Fuller's Ideas for Today, 1997, ISBN 0-471-19812-9.
- Co-editor (with Stewart Brand and others): Whole Earth Catalogs, 1968–1998.
- Co-editor (with Stewart Brand): Soft-Tech, 1978, ISBN 0-14-004806-5.
- Editor Whole Earth Ecolog: The Best of Environmental Tools & Ideas, 1990, ISBN 0-517-57658-9.
