= Eden Project =

Visitor attraction in Cornwall, England

- Edenva
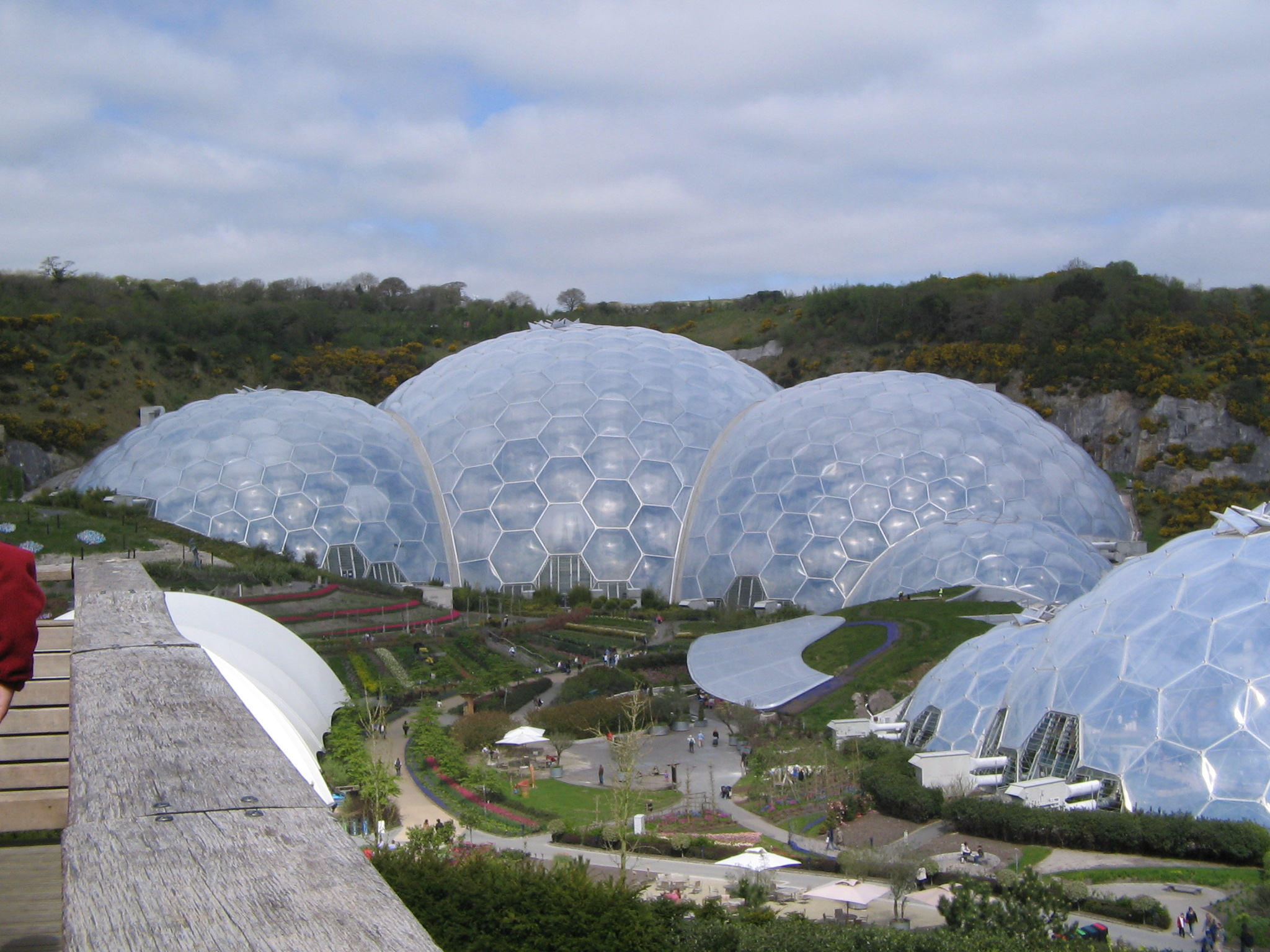
- Interactive map of the Eden Project area

General information
- Type: Multiple greenhouse complex
- Architectural style: Inspired by James T. Baldwin's Pillow Dome
- Location: Cornwall, England
- Coordinates: 50°21′43″N 4°44′41″W
- Completed: May 2000; 26 years ago
- Opened: 17 March 2001; 25 years ago

Technical details
- Structural system: Steel frame and thermoplastic

Design and construction
- Architect: Grimshaw Architects
- Structural engineer: Anthony Hunt and Associates
- Services engineer: Arup

The Eden Project (Cornish: Edenva) is a visitor attraction in Cornwall, England owned and operated by registered charity the Eden Trust. The project is located in a reclaimed china clay pit.

The complex is dominated by two huge enclosures consisting of adjoining domes that house thousands of plant species, and each enclosure emulates a natural biome. The biomes consist of hundreds of hexagonal and pentagonal ethylene tetrafluoroethylene (ETFE) inflated cells supported by geodesic tubular steel domes. The larger of the two biomes simulates a rainforest environment (and is one of the largest indoor rainforests in the world) and the second, a Mediterranean environment.

The attraction also has an outside botanical garden which is home to many plants and wildlife native to Cornwall and the UK in general; it also has many plants that provide an important and interesting backstory, for example, those with a prehistoric heritage.

Several other Eden Project locations have been proposed and planned in various locations around the world.

== History ==
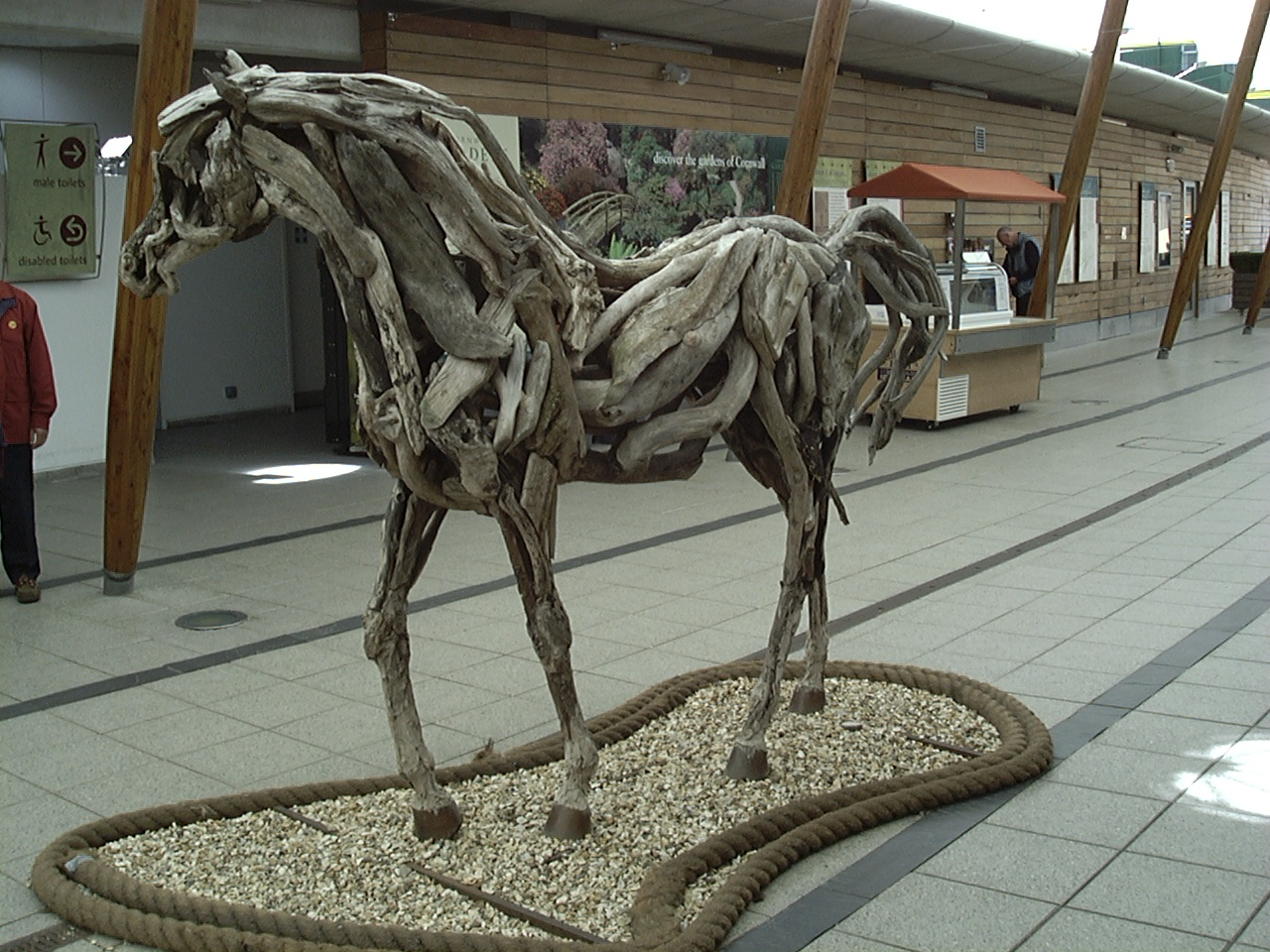
Driftwood sculpture of a horse by Heather Jansch, from the main entrance

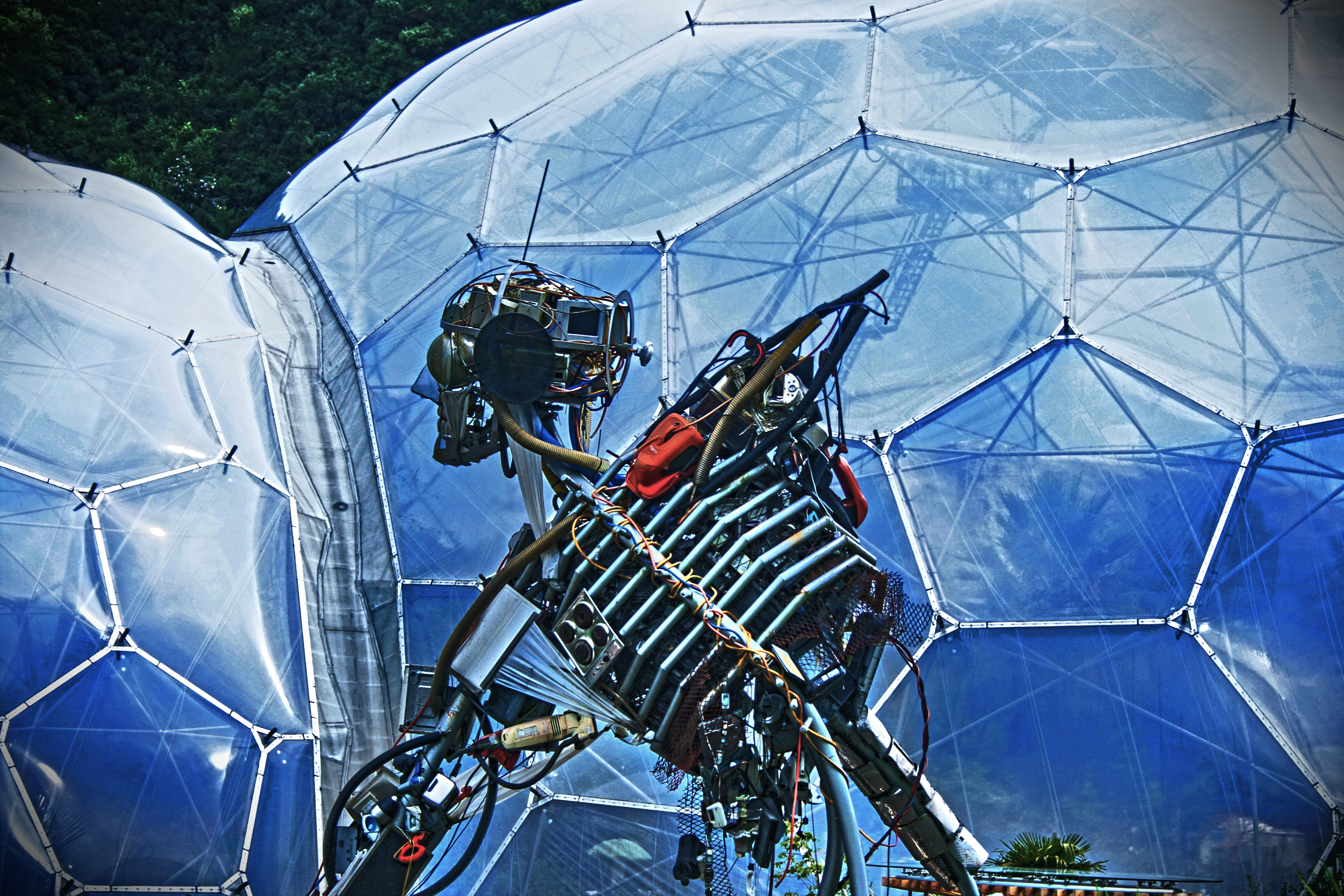
Eden Project sculpture Made from the detritus of modern living—the teeth are computer mice

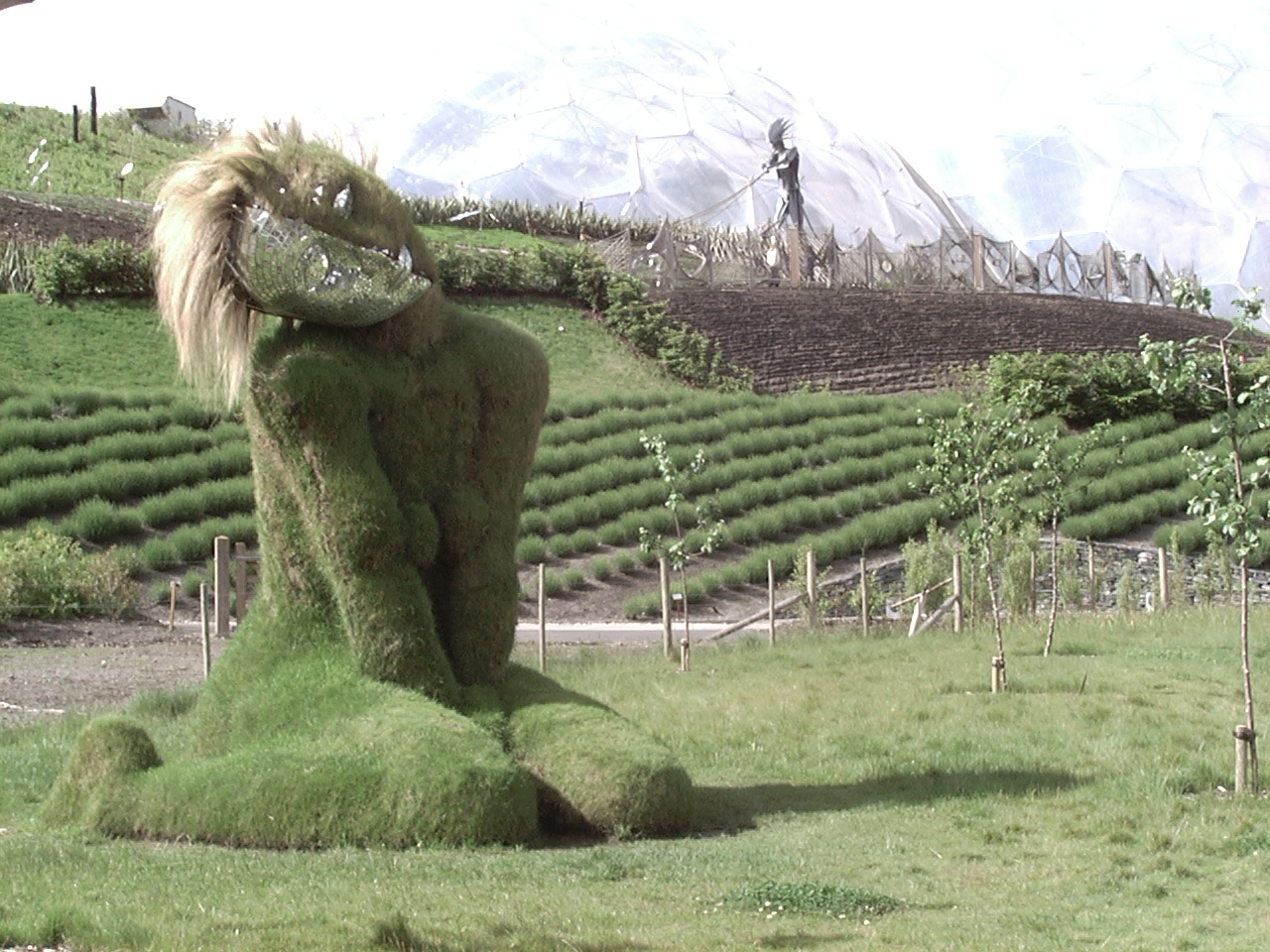
Eve, by Sue and Pete Hill, shaped from the soil

The clay pit in which the project is sited was in use for over 160 years. In 1981, the pit was used by the BBC as the planet surface of Magrathea in the TV series the Hitchhiker's Guide to the Galaxy. By the mid-1990s the pit was all but exhausted.

The initial idea for the project dates back to 1996, with construction beginning in 1998. The work was hampered by torrential rain in the first few months of the project, and parts of the pit flooded as it sits 15 m (49 ft) below the water table.

The first part of the Eden Project, the visitor centre, opened to the public in May 2000. The first plants began arriving in September of that year, and the full site opened on 17 March 2001.

To counter criticism from environmental groups, the Eden Project committed to investigate a rail link to the site. The rail link was never built, and car parking on the site is still funded from revenue generated from general admission ticket sales. A bus service links the site to St Austell railway station, on the Cornish Main Line.

The Eden Project was used as a filming location for the 2002 James Bond film Die Another Day. On 2 July 2005 The Eden Project hosted the "Africa Calling" concert of the Live 8 concert series. It has also provided some plants for the British Museum's Africa garden.

In 2005, the Project launched "A Time of Gifts" for the winter months, November to February. This features an ice rink covering the lake, with a small café-bar attached, as well as a Christmas market. Cornish choirs regularly perform in the biomes.

In 2007, the Eden Project campaigned unsuccessfully for £50 million in Big Lottery Fund money for a proposed desert biome. It received just 12.07% of the votes, the lowest for the four projects being considered. As part of the campaign, the Eden Project invited people all over Cornwall to try to break the world record for the biggest ever pub quiz as part of its campaign to bring £50 million of lottery funds to Cornwall.

In December 2009, much of the project, including both greenhouses, became available to navigate through Google Street View.

The Eden Trust revealed a trading loss of £1.3 million for 2012–13, on a turnover of £25.4 million. The Eden Project had posted a surplus of £136,000 for the previous year. In 2014 Eden accounts showed a surplus of £2 million.

The World Pasty Championships, an international competition to find the best Cornish pasties and other pasty-type savoury snacks, have been held at the Eden Project since 2012.

The Eden Project is said to have contributed over £1 billion to the Cornish economy. In 2016, Eden became home to Europe's second-largest redwood forest (after the Giants Grove at Birr Castle, Birr Castle, Ireland) when forty saplings of coast redwoods, Sequoia sempervirens, which could live for 4,000 years and reach 115 metres in height, were planted there.

The Eden Project received 1,010,095 visitors in 2019.

In December 2020 the project was closed after heavy rain caused several landslips at the site. Delayed by Covid lockdowns, it reopened by May 2021 after remedial works had taken place. The site was used for an event during the 2021 G7 Summit, hosted by the United Kingdom.

== Design and construction ==
The project was conceived by Tim Smit and Jonathan Ball, and designed by Grimshaw Architects and structural engineering firm Anthony Hunt Associates (now part of Sinclair Knight Merz). Davis Langdon carried out the project management, Sir Robert McAlpine and Alfred McAlpine did the construction, MERO jointly designed and built the biome steel structures, the ETFE pillows that build the façade were realized by Vector Foiltec, and Arup was the services engineer, economic consultant, environmental engineer and transportation engineer. Land Use Consultants led the masterplan and landscape design. The project took 2½ years to construct and opened to the public on 17 March 2001.

== Site ==
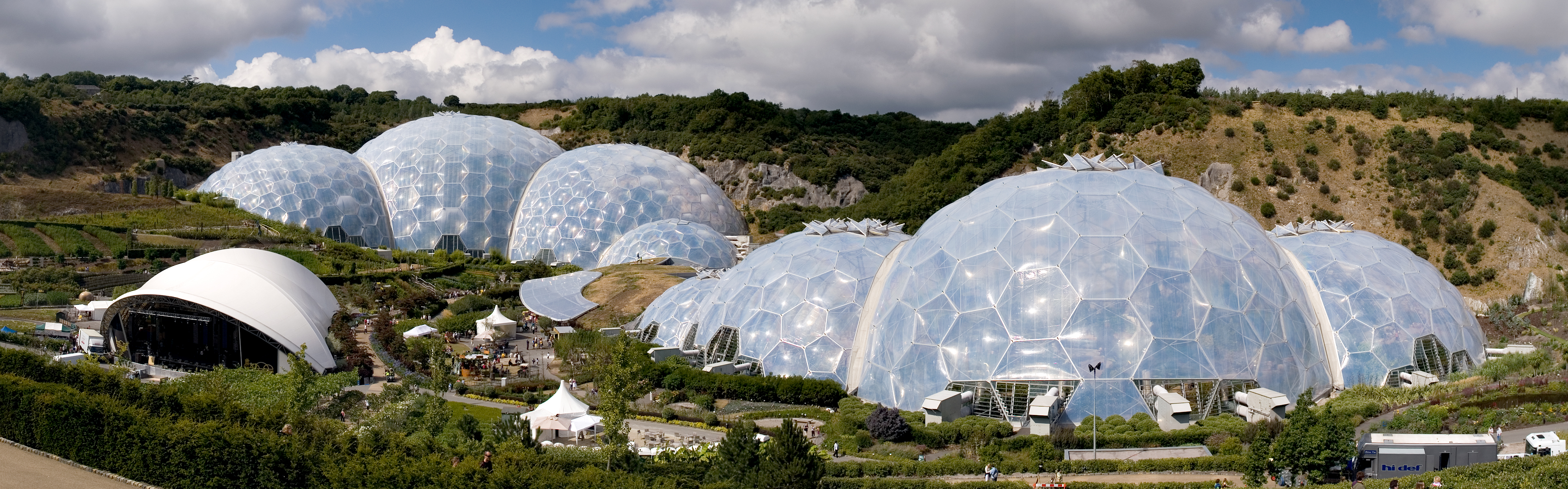
Panoramic view of the geodesic biome domes at the Eden Project

=== Layout ===
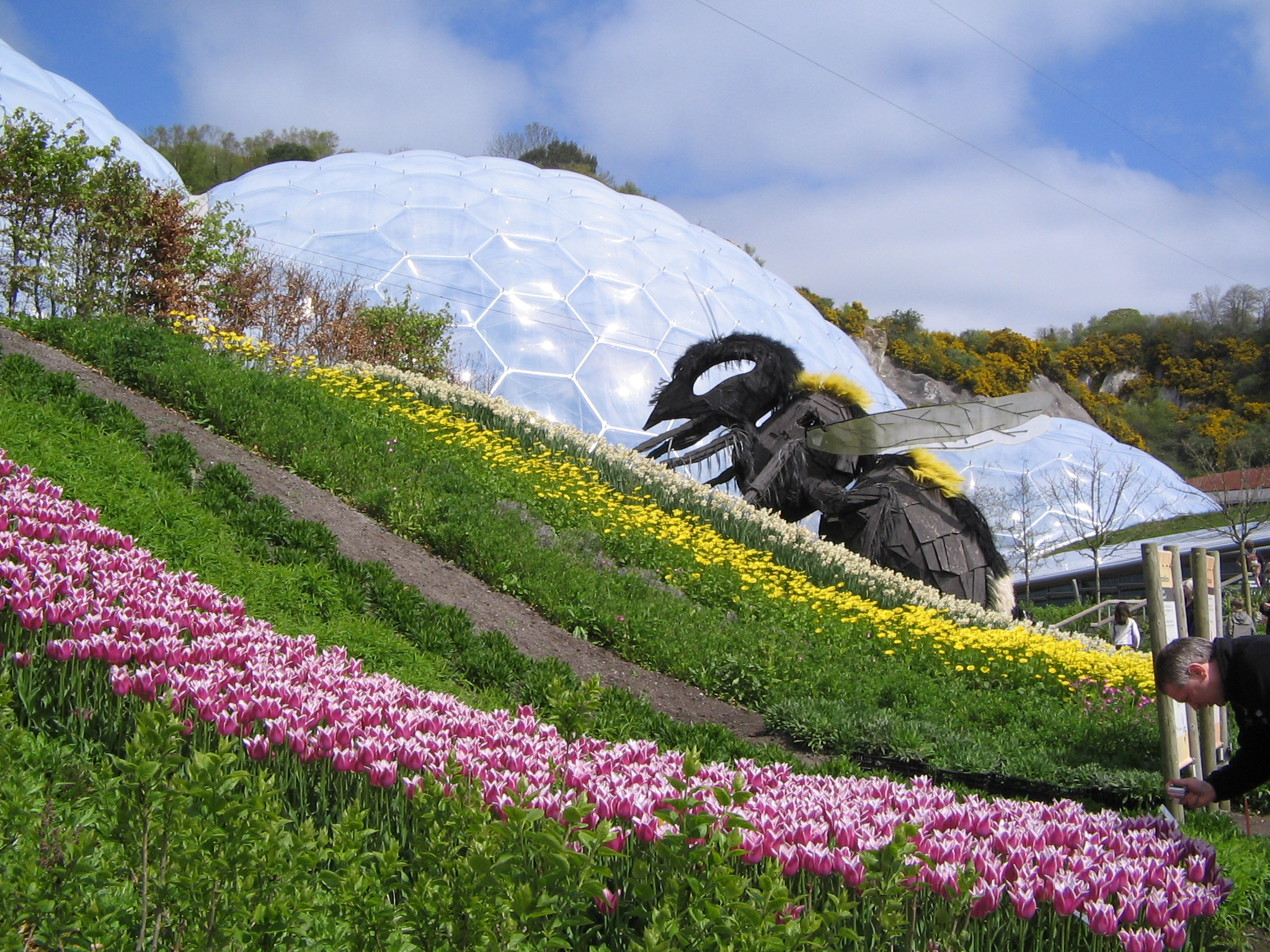
The Bee

Once into the attraction, there is a meandering path with views of the two biomes, planted landscapes, including vegetable gardens, and sculptures that include a giant bee and previously The WEEE Man (removed in 2016), a towering figure made from old electrical appliances and was meant to represent the average electrical waste used by one person in a lifetime.

=== Biomes ===
At the bottom of the pit are two covered biomes:

The Rainforest Biome, covers 1.56 ha (3.9 acres) and measures 55 m (180 ft) high, 100 m (328 ft) wide, and 200 m (656 ft) long. It is used for tropical plants, such as fruiting banana plants, coffee, rubber, and giant bamboo, and is kept at a tropical temperature and moisture level.

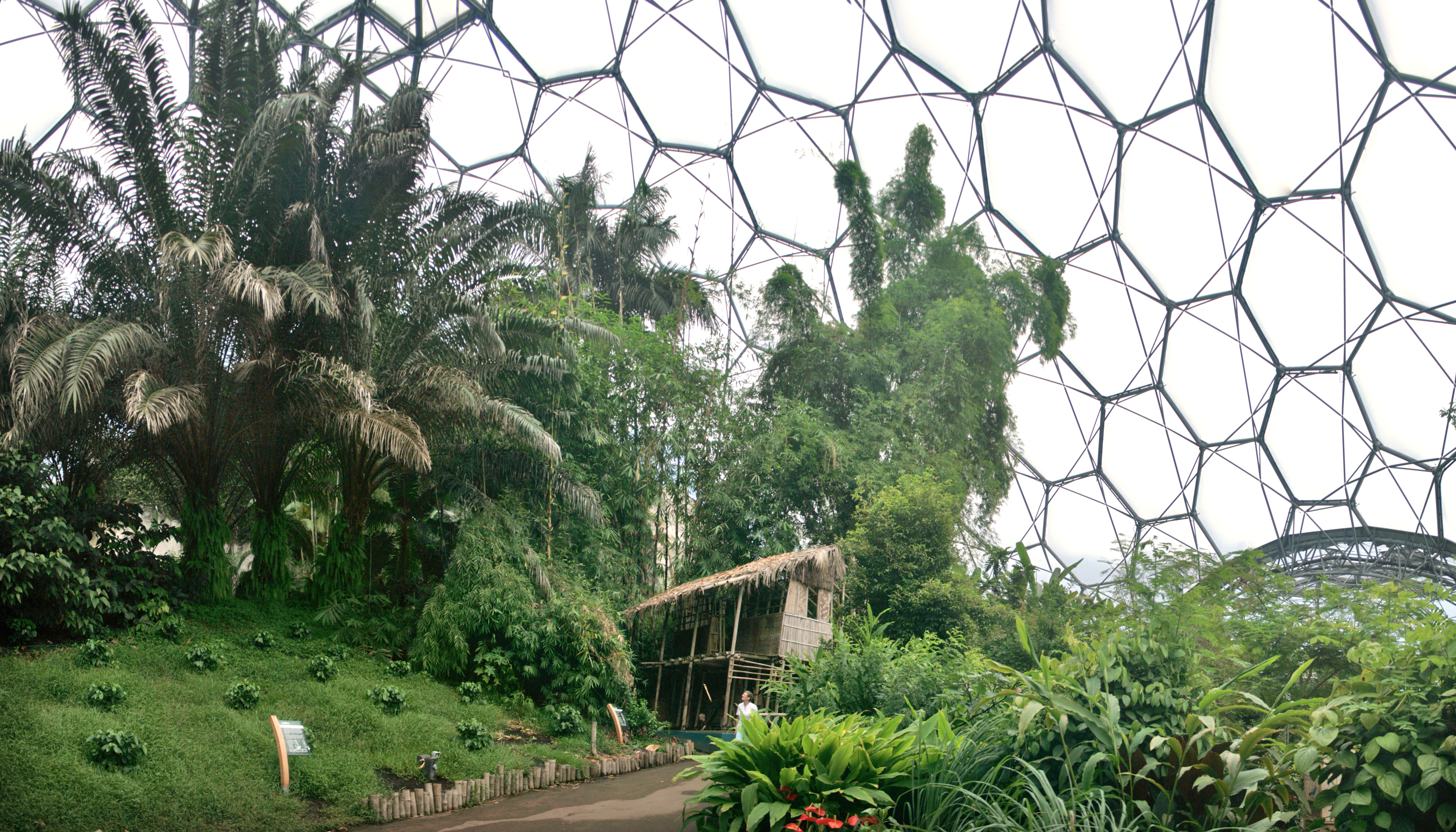
The Rainforest Biome

The Mediterranean Biome covers 0.654 ha (1.6 acres) and measures 35 m (115 ft) high, 65 m (213 ft) wide, and 135 m (443 ft) long. It houses familiar warm temperate and arid plants such as olives and grape vines and various sculptures.

The Outdoor Gardens represent the temperate regions of the world with plants such as tea, lavender, hops, hemp, and sunflowers, as well as local plant species.

The covered biomes are constructed from a tubular steel (hex-tri-hex) with mostly hexagonal external cladding panels made from the thermoplastic ETFE. Glass was avoided due to its weight and potential dangers. The cladding panels themselves are created from several layers of thin UV-transparent ETFE film, which are sealed around their perimeter and inflated to create a large cushion. The resulting cushion acts as a thermal blanket to the structure. The ETFE material is resistant to most stains, which simply wash off in the rain. If required, cleaning can be performed by abseilers. Although the ETFE is susceptible to punctures, these can be easily fixed with ETFE tape. The structure is completely self-supporting, with no internal supports, and takes the form of a geodesic structure. The panels vary in size up to 9 m (29.5 ft) across, with the largest at the top of the structure.

The ETFE technology was supplied and installed by the firm Vector Foiltec, which is also responsible for ongoing maintenance of the cladding. The steel spaceframe and cladding package (with Vector Foiltec as ETFE subcontractor) was designed, supplied and installed by MERO (UK) PLC, who also jointly developed the overall scheme geometry with the architect, Nicholas Grimshaw & Partners.

The entire build project was managed by McAlpine Joint Venture.

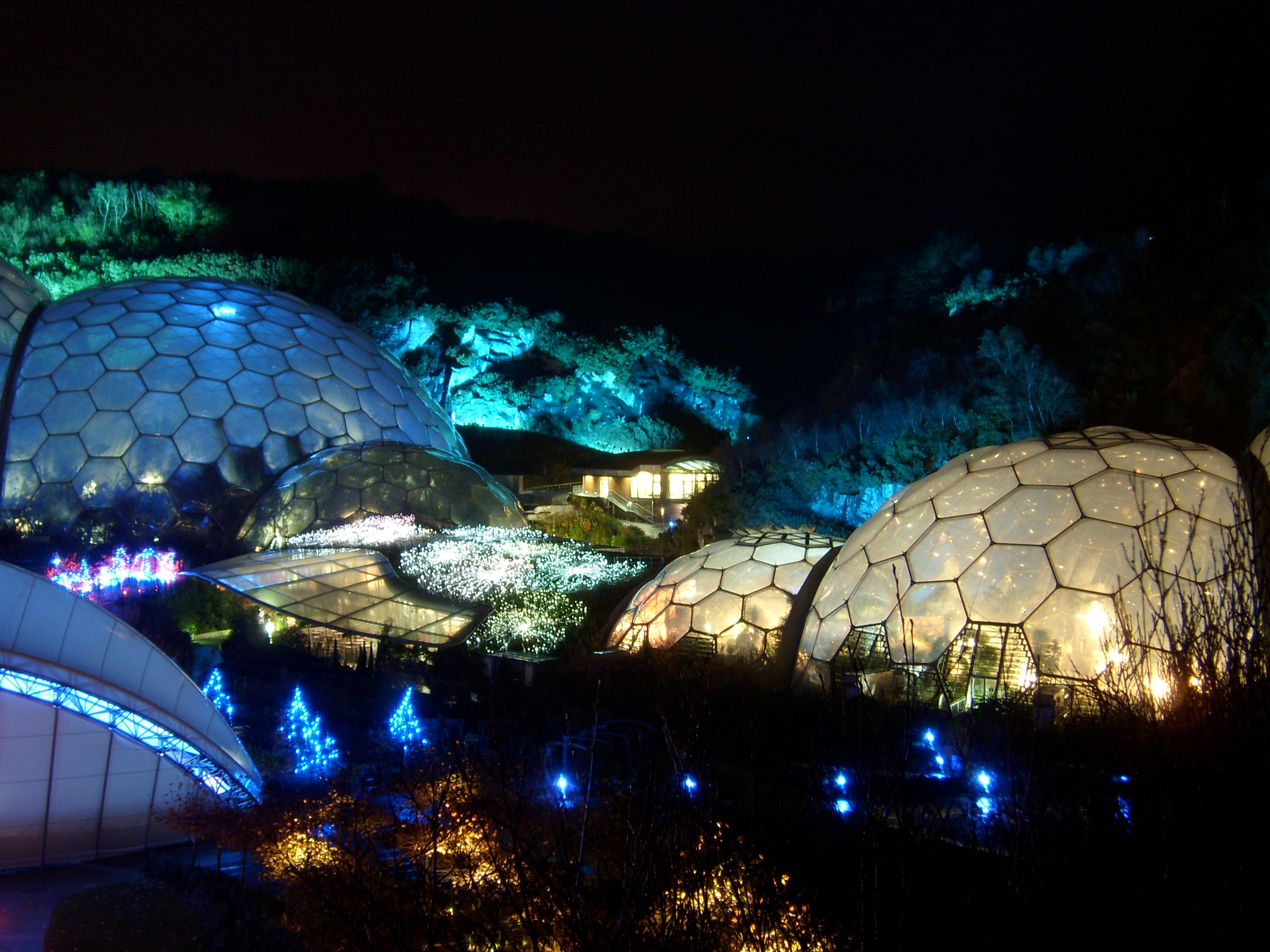
The Biomes and Link building showing Field of Light installation by Bruce Munro

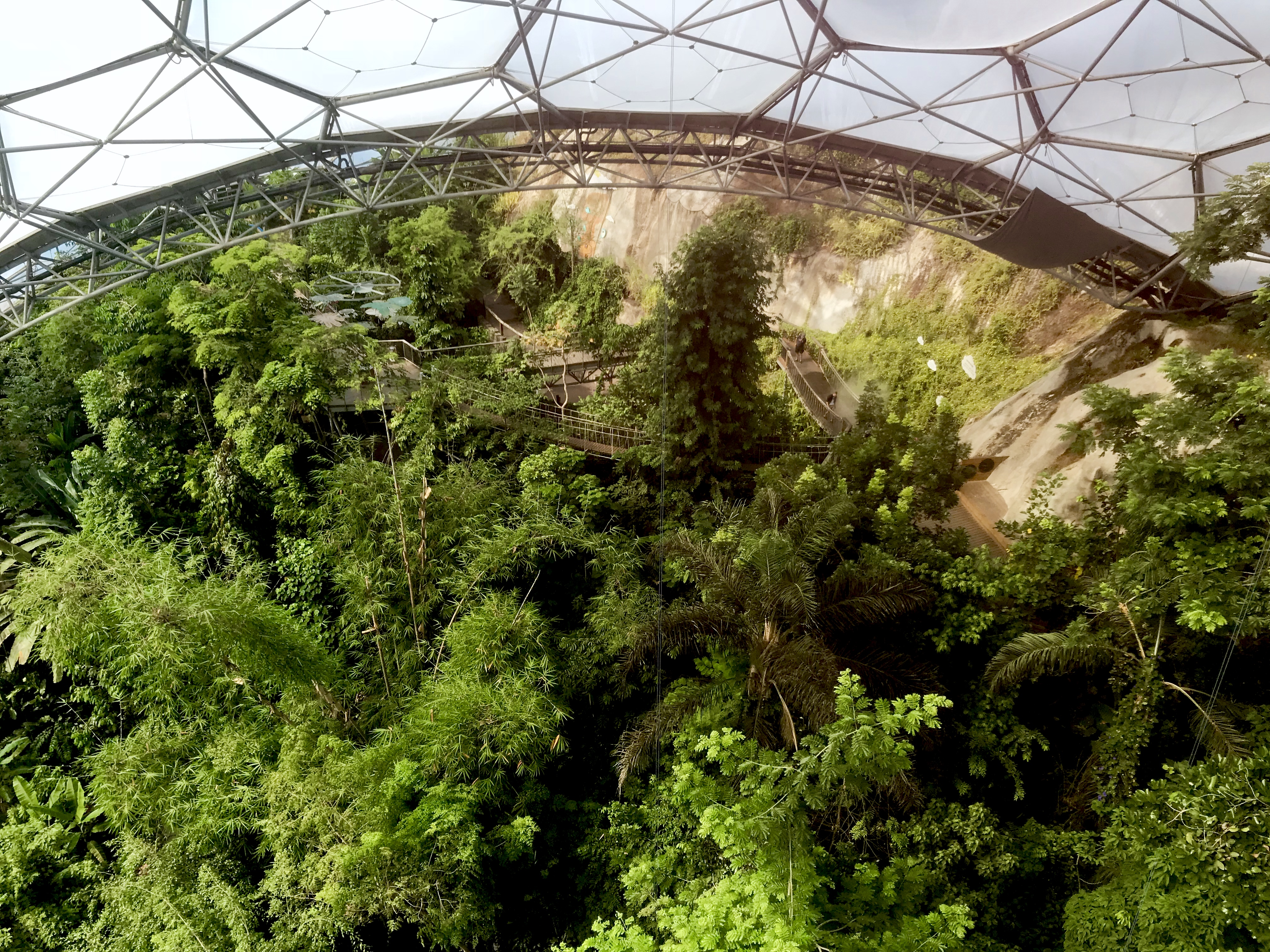
Inside the Rainforest Biome

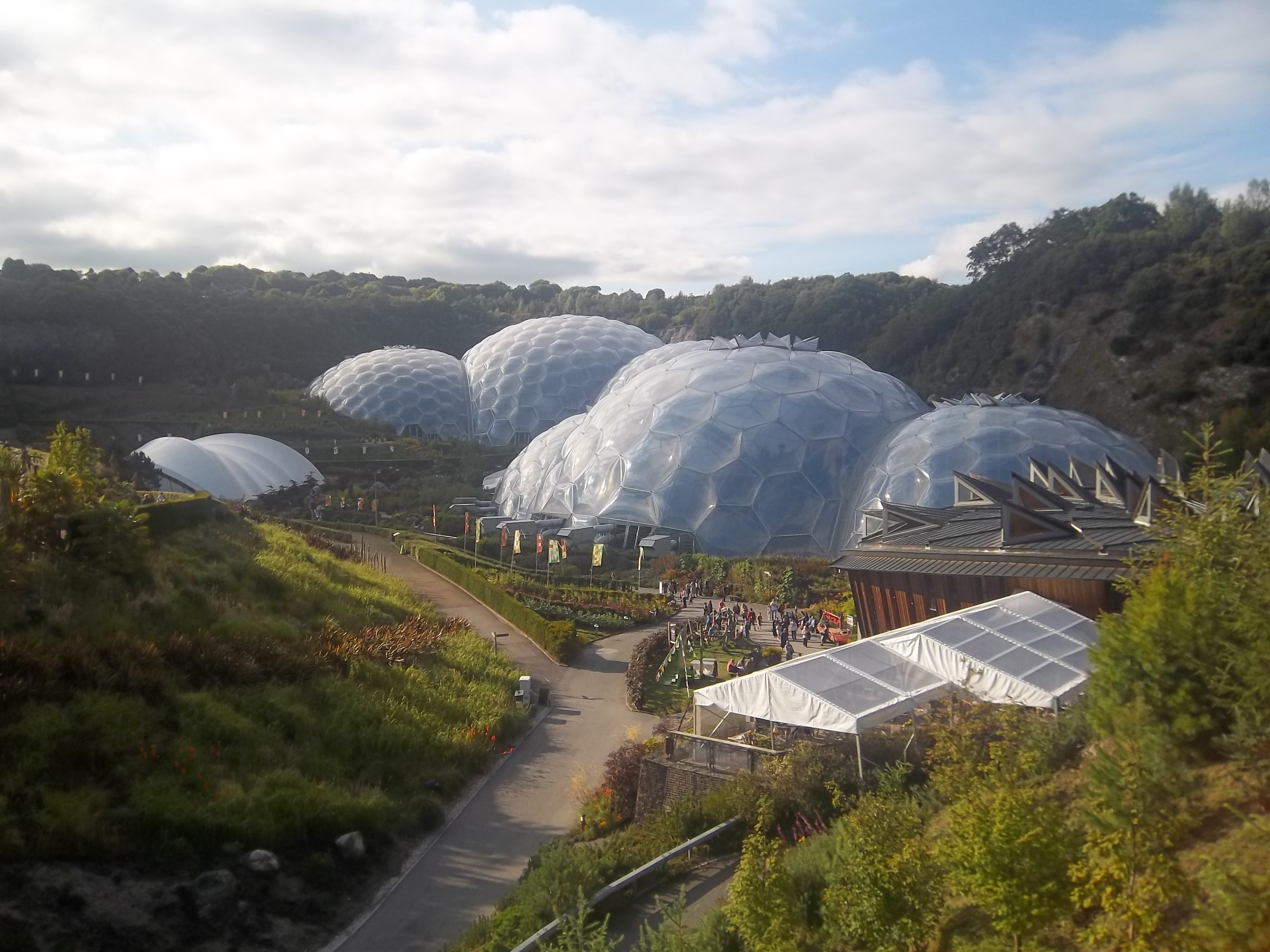
The Biomes (or eco domes) at The Eden Project in Cornwall

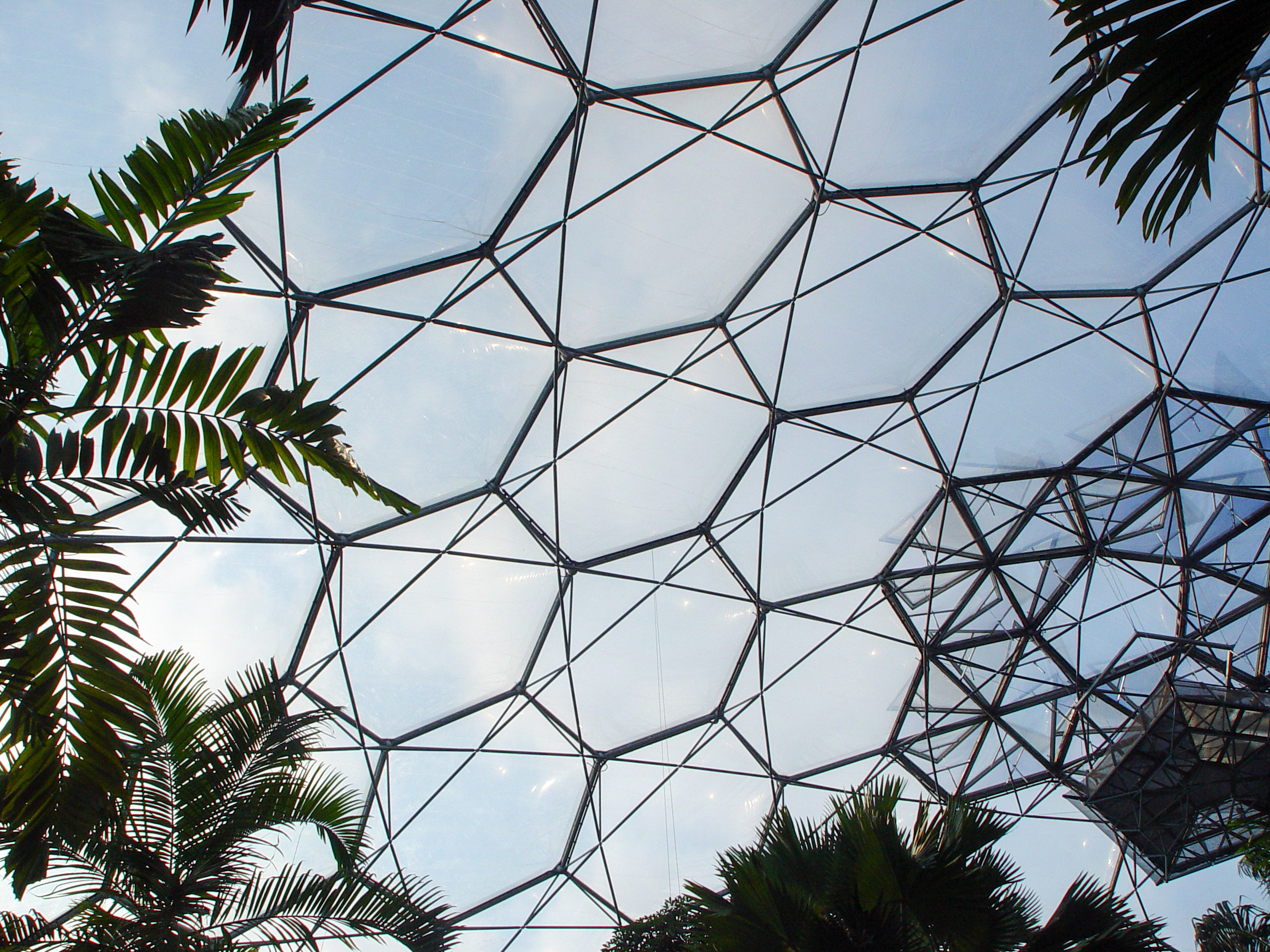
The hexagonal structure looking from the inside

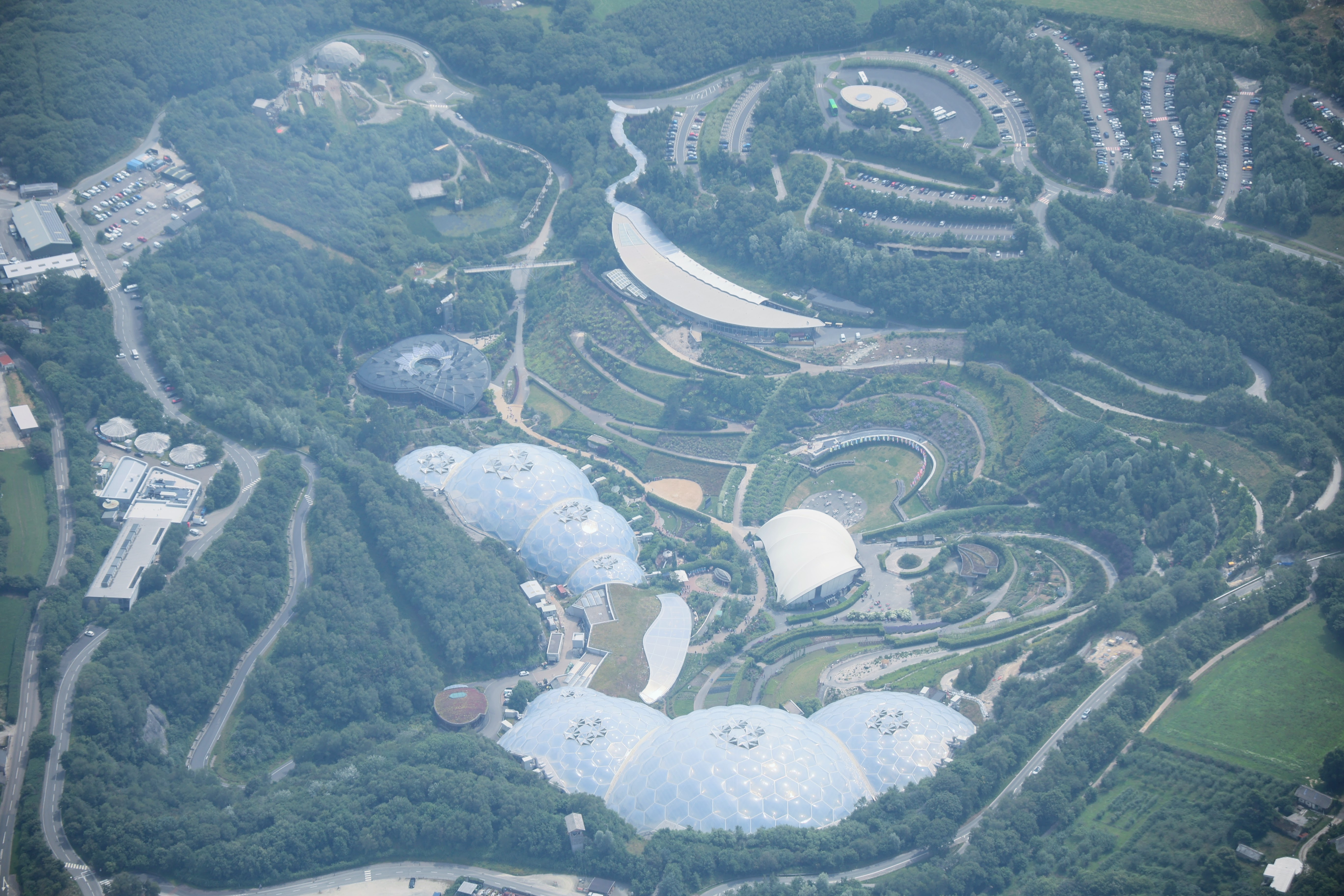
Aerial View

=== The Core ===
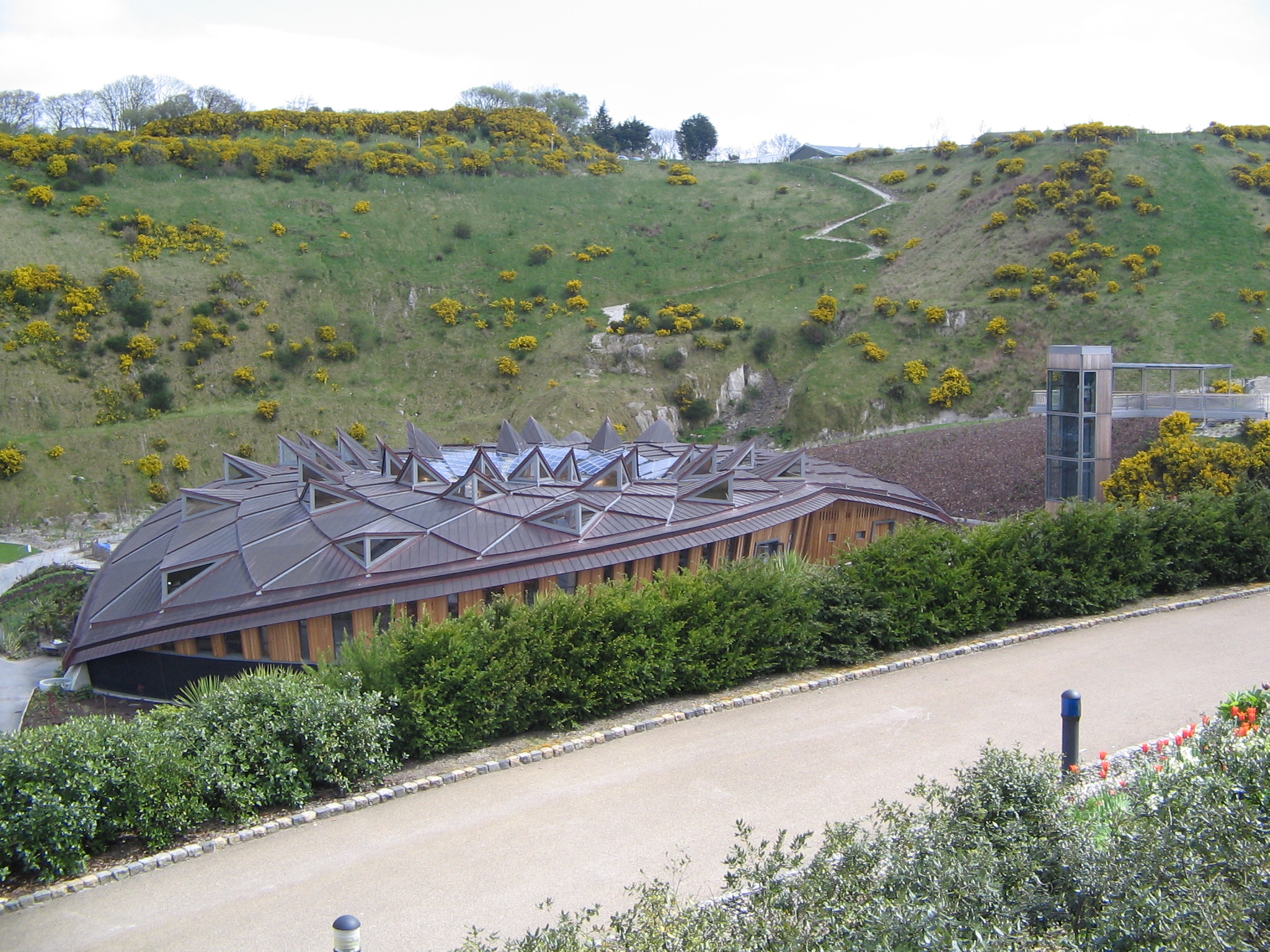
The Core

The Core is the latest addition to the site and opened in September 2005. It provides the Eden Project with an education facility, incorporating classrooms and exhibition spaces designed to help communicate Eden's central message about the relationship between people and plants. Accordingly, the building has taken its inspiration from plants, most noticeable in the form of the soaring timber roof, which gives the building its distinctive shape.

Grimshaw developed the geometry of the copper-clad roof in collaboration with a sculptor, Peter Randall-Page, and Mike Purvis of structural engineers SKM Anthony Hunts. It is derived from phyllotaxis, which is the mathematical basis for nearly all plant growth; the "opposing spirals" found in many plants such as the seeds in a sunflower's head, pine cones, and pineapples. The copper was obtained from traceable sources, and the Eden Project is working with Rio Tinto to explore the possibility of encouraging further traceable supply routes for metals, which would enable users to avoid metals mined unethically. The services and acoustic, mechanical, and electrical engineering design was carried out by Buro Happold.

==== Art at The Core ====
Seed by Peter Randall-Page

The Core is also home to art exhibitions throughout the year. A permanent installation entitled Seed, by Peter Randall-Page, occupies the anteroom. Seed is a large, 70 tonne egg-shaped installation, carved from a single block of granite from De Lank Quarry on Bodmin Moor, standing some 13 feet (4.0 m) tall and displaying a complex pattern of protrusions that are based upon the geometric and mathematical principles that underlie plant growth.

== Environmental aspects ==
The biomes provide diverse growing conditions, and many plants are on display.

The Eden Project includes environmental education focusing on the interdependence of plants and people; plants are labelled with their medicinal uses. The massive amounts of water required to create the humid conditions of the Tropical Biome, and to serve the toilet facilities, are all sanitised rain water that would otherwise collect at the bottom of the quarry. The only mains water used is for hand washing and for cooking. The complex also uses Green Tariff Electricity – some of the energy comes from one of the many wind turbines in Cornwall, which were among the first in Europe.

In December 2010 the Eden Project received permission to build a geothermal electricity plant which will generate approx 4MWe, enough to supply Eden and about 5000 households. The project will involve geothermal heating as well as geothermal electricity. Cornwall Council and the European Union came up with the greater part of £16.8m required to start the project. First a well will be sunk nearly 3 miles (4.5 km) into the granite crust underneath Eden.

Eden co-founder, Sir Tim Smit said, "Since we began, Eden has had a dream that the world should be powered by renewable energy. The sun can provide massive solar power and the wind has been harnessed by humankind for thousands of years, but because both are intermittent and battery technology cannot yet store all we need there is a gap. We believe the answer lies beneath our feet in the heat underground that can be accessed by drilling technology that pumps water towards the centre of the Earth and brings it back up superheated to provide us with heat and electricity".

Drilling began in May 2021, and heating of the biomes began in 2023, using 85°C.

== Other projects ==
=== Eden Project Morecambe ===
In 2018, the Eden Project revealed its design for a new version of the project, located on the seafront in Morecambe, Lancashire. There will be biomes shaped like mussels and a focus on the marine environment. There will also be reimagined lidos, gardens, performance spaces, immersive experiences, and observatories.

Grimshaw are the architects for the project, which is expected to cost £80 million. The project is a partnership with the Lancashire Enterprise Partnership, Lancaster University, Lancashire County Council, and Lancaster City Council. In December 2018, the four local partners agreed to provide £1 million to develop the idea, which allowed the development of an outline planning application for the project. It is expected that there will be 500 jobs created and 8,000 visitors a day to the site.

Having been granted planning permission in January 2022 and with £50 million of levelling-up funding granted in January 2023, it is due to open in late 2028 and predicted to benefit the North West economy by £200 million per year. In July 2024, Lancaster City Council received the first £2.5m of a promised £50m in UK government funding for the scheme. The grant would be used to appoint a main contractor to develop the designs for Eden Project Morecambe.

In February 2026, councillors approved revised plans for a half-sized version of the £100m project, featuring two domes rather than four.

=== Eden Project Dundee ===
In May 2020, the Eden Project revealed plans to establish their first attraction in Scotland, and named Dundee as the proposed site of the location. The city's Camperdown Park was widely touted to be the proposed location of the new attraction however in May 2021, it was announced that the Eden Project had chosen the site of the former gasworks in Dundee as the location. It was planned that the new development would result in 200 new jobs and "contribute £27m a year to the regional economy". The project is in partnership with Dundee City Council, the University of Dundee and the Northwood Charitable Trust.

In 2021, Eden Project announced that they would establish fourteen hectares of new wildflower habitat in areas across Dundee, including Morgan Academy and Caird Park.

In July 2023, new images were released depicting what the Dundee attraction would look which accompanied the planning permission documents for the new attraction which would be submitted by autumn 2023.

Planning permission for the project was approved by Dundee City Council in June 2024.

=== South Downs ===
In 2020, Eastbourne Borough Council and the Eden Project announced a joint project to explore the viability of a new Eden site in the South Downs National Park.

=== Qingdao, China ===
In 2015, the Eden Project announced that it had reached an agreement to construct an Eden site in Qingdao, China. While the site had originally been slated to open by 2020, construction fell behind schedule due to the COVID-19 pandemic and the opening date was delayed to 2023. The new site is expected to focus on "water" and its central role in civilization and nature.

=== Eden Project New Zealand ===
A planned Eden Project for the New Zealand city of Christchurch, to be called Eden Project New Zealand/Eden Project Aotearoa, was expected to be inaugurated in 2025. It was to be centred close to the Avon River, on a site largely razed as a result of the 2011 Christchurch Earthquake. The project has since been cancelled.

== Eden Sessions ==
Since 2002, the Project has hosted a series of musical performances, called the Eden Sessions, usually held during the summer. The 2020 sessions were postponed due to the COVID-19 pandemic and were rescheduled as the 2022 sessions lineup.

The currently announced acts for the 2026 sessions will be headlined by Pixies, the Maccabees, Bowling for Soup, Frank Turner & the Sleeping Souls, Bastille, Becky Hill, Snow Patrol, Wolf Alice, Mika, Ben Howard and CMAT.

=== Lineup history ===
Date	Headliner	Supporting Act(s)
2002
5 July	Pulp	Chilly Gonzales and British Sea Power
6 July	Spiritualized	Beth Orton and Six by Seven
12 July	Doves	The Soundtrack of Our Lives and The Rapture
2003
1 August	Badly Drawn Boy	The Thrills
5 August	Moby	The Orb
15 August	PJ Harvey	Elbow
22 August	World of Music, Arts and Dance	
2004
16 July	Brian Wilson	
6 August	Primal Scream	
13 August	Air	Super Furry Animals
20 August	Supergrass	The Beta Band
27 August	World of Music, Arts and Dance	
2005
2 July	Live 8: Africa Calling	
1 August	Keane	Editors
19 August	Embrace	Hard-Fi
26 August	Basement Jaxx	Lady Sovereign
27 August	Ian Brown	Badly Drawn Boy and British Sea Power
2006
12 August	The Magic Numbers	José González
22 August	Muse	Hey Molly and Nixon and the Burn
25 August	Goldfrapp	Ladytron
27 August	Snow Patrol	Rocco DeLuca and Liam Frost
2007
20 June	Peter Gabriel	
2 July	James Morrison	
10 July	Rufus Wainwright	Hot Chip
17 July	Amy Winehouse	Leon Jean-Marie
18 July	Lily Allen	Mark Ronson
22 July	Pet Shop Boys	Dirty Pretty Things
2008
27 June	The Verve	
29 June	The Raconteurs	Vampire Weekend
11 July	Bill Bailey	
15 July	Kaiser Chiefs	White Lies and Late of the Pier
25 July	KT Tunstall	Guillemots and Sons and Daughters
2009
4 July	Kasabian	
9 July	Razorlight	The Maccabees
10 July	Paul Weller	Florence and the Machine
14 July	Oasis	
18 July	The Kooks	Ladyhawke
2010
26 June	Jack Johnson	Mojave 3
27 June	Mika	Diana Vickers
2 July	Doves	Mumford & Sons
3 July	Calvin Harris	Audio Bullys
9 July	Al Murray	Greg Davies and Craig Campbell
13–14 July	Paolo Nutini	Martha Wainwright
2011
23 June	Primal Scream	The Horrors and Seth Lakeman
25 June	Pendulum	Pretty Lights
30 June	The Flaming Lips	The Go! Team and OK Go
1 July	Fleet Foxes	Villagers and The Bees
12 July	Brandon Flowers	Mystery Jets and Crowns
2012
23 June	Tim Minchin	Craig Campbell
30 June	Example	Rudimental
1 July	Frank Turner	Stornoway, Bellowhead, Mull Historical Society, Seth Lakeman, The Staves, and Dodgy
4 July	Chase & Status	Labrinth
6 July	Plan B	Bebe Black
8 July	Blink-182	Crowns, The Computers, Bangers, and Black Tambourines
11 July	Noah and the Whale	The Vaccines
2013
3 June	Eddie Izzard	
29 June	Kaiser Chiefs	Tom Tom Club and Deap Vally
30 June	Sigur Rós	Daughter and Willy Mason
2 July	The xx	CHIC (featuring Nile Rodgers)
13–14 July	Jessie J	A*M*E
2014
21 June	Dizzee Rascal	Katy B and Backbeat Soundsystem
25 June	Skrillex	
8 July	Ellie Goulding	Kwabs
9 July	Pixies	Tricot
14–15 July	Elbow	Jimi Goodwin
2015
12 June	Paolo Nutini	The Staves and Harry Collier
16–17 June	Elton John	
24 June	Paloma Faith	Liam Bailey
27 June	Motörhead	The Stranglers and King Creature
9 July	Spandau Ballet	Rusty Egan
17 July	Ben Howard	Joe Pug
2016
14–15 June	Lionel Richie	Corinne Bailey Rae
22 June	Jess Glynne	Jay Prince
26 June	Tom Jones	
27 June	PJ Harvey	Jehnny Beth
9 July	Manic Street Preachers	Bill Ryder-Jones and The Anchoress
2017
15 June	Bastille	Rationale
16 June	Madness	Backbeat Soundsystem
22 June	Royal Blood	Turbowolf
23 June	Blondie	Dodgy
1 July	Van Morrison	Paul O'Brady
6 July	Bryan Adams	
11 July	Foals	Everything Everything
2018
6 June	Gary Barlow	Jason Brock
15–16 June	Massive Attack	Young Fathers
23 June	Levellers	New Model Army and Reef
30 June	Ben Howard	Gwenno
3 July	Queens of the Stone Age	CRX
5 July	Jack Johnson	Nick Mulvey
7 July	Björk	Lanark Artefax and Klein
2019
20 June	Stereophonics	Sea Girls and The Wind and The Wave
21 & 23 June	Nile Rodgers & CHIC	Kokoroko, Doves, Dreadzone, Asian Dub Foundation, Bill Jefferson, and Backbeat Soundsystem
26 June	Liam Gallagher	Fontaines D.C. and The Velvet Hands
28 June	The Chemical Brothers	James Holroyd
2–3 July	Kylie Minogue	Nina Nesbitt
2021
11 September	Ben Howard	Femmes De La Mer
12 September	McFly	Ultra Violets
14 September	Royal Blood	The Mysterines
16 September	Snow Patrol	Lucy Blue
17 September	The Script	Ward Thomas
18 September	Idles	Spectres and Black Honey
2022
16–17 May	My Chemical Romance	Frank Turner and LostAlone
15 June	Noel Gallagher’s High Flying Birds	Confidence Man
17–18 June	Nine Inch Nails	Nitzer Ebb and Yves Tumor
21 June	Diana Ross	DJ Offline
29 June	Bryan Adams	
5 July	Stereophonics	Himalayas
2023
7 June	Lionel Richie	Gabrielle
10 June	Yungblud	Crawlers
18 June	The War on Drugs	Beth Orton
23 June	Jack Johnson	Hollie Cook
24 June	Incubus	Lealani and Far From Saints
28 June	Pet Shop Boys	Mike Pickering
1 July	Kasabian	Miles Kane
7 July	Anne-Marie	Rachel Chinouriri
25 July	The Who	Simon Townshend
2024
12 June	Crowded House	Liam Finn
14 June	Fatboy Slim	Charlie Boon
19 June	Paolo Nutini	Prima Queen
29 June	Manic Street Preachers; Suede	
2 July	The National	This Is The Kit
3 July	Rick Astley	The Lightning Seeds
5 July	Tom Grennan	Liv Dawson
13 July	JLS	Tinchy Stryder
2025
12 June	Texas	KT Tunstall
18 June	Gary Barlow	Beverley Knight
25 June	The Script	Tom Walker
26 June	Deftones	High Vis
9–10 July	Biffy Clyro	Nova Twins
12 July	Madness	Rhoda Dakar
13 July	The Libertines	Fletchr Fletchr, Mên An Tol, Sports Team and Frank Turner and The Sleeping Souls
2026
16 June	Wolf Alice	Girl In The Year Above
18 June	Snow Patrol	The Florentinas
20 June	Becky Hill	Charlie G and Tom Aspaul
26 June	Pixies	Gans
5 July	Bowling for Soup and Frank Turner and The Sleeping Souls	American Hi-Fi
9 July	Bastille	Many Men Soundsystem and Alfie Templeton
10 July	Ben Howard	The Kit and Clara Mann
11 July	The Maccabees	Everything Everything, Tom A. Smith, Tummyache, The Velvet Hands and Matilda Finn Francis
12 July	Mika	MEEK
15 July	CMAT	Katy J Pearson

=== Cancelled acts ===
In 2022, Lionel Richie cancelled his entire European tour, which included his Eden Session show, due to ongoing concerns of COVID-19. He later rescheduled for the 2023 sessions.

In 2025, Kneecap where originally announced as part of that years sessions lineup. Their show was later cancelled due to controversial comments they made.

In January 2026, Neil Young was announced as part of that years sessions lineup, however, the following month it was announced that Young had cancelled all dates on his European tour, which included his Eden Sessions show.

== In the media ==
The Eden Project has appeared in various television shows and films such as the James Bond film Die Another Day, The Bad Education Movie, in the Netflix series The Last Bus, in the CBeebies show Andy's Aquatic Adventure and in Armenia’s postcard in the Eurovision Song Contest 2023.

A weekly radio show called The Eden Radio Project is held every Thursday afternoon on CHAOS Radio, formerly known as Radio St Austell Bay.

On 18 November 2019, on the Trees A Crowd podcast, David Oakes interviewed Eden Project's Head of Interpretation, Dr Jo Elworthy, about the site.

== See also ==
- BIOS-3
- Biosphere 2
- Closed ecological system
- IBTS Greenhouse
- Montreal Biodome
- Montreal Biosphère
- Mitchell Park Horticultural Conservatory ("The Domes" of Milwaukee)
- Ecosystem
- Vivarium
- The Lost Gardens of Heligan
- List of topics related to Cornwall
- Earthpark
- Sir Richard Carew Pole
- Thin-shell structure
- List of thin shell structures
