= Earthpark =

Coordinates: 41.35°N 93.0°W

Earthpark is a proposed best-in-class educational facility with indoor rain forest and aquarium elements, and a mission of "inspiring generations to learn from the natural world." It was previously called the Environmental Project. Inspired by The Eden Project in Cornwall, England, Earthpark was aimed to be an educational ecosystem and a popular visitor attraction. The project remains dormant since 2008, though it was briefly re-visited in 2018.

== History and Funding ==
Earthpark was to be located around Lake Red Rock, near the town of Pella, Iowa.

Proposals from a variety of potential hosts, some outside of Iowa are being considered. Talks between Earthpark and the city of Coralville, Iowa, the original planned location of Earthpark, ended in 2006. The project then found a new home in Pella, Iowa. but that did not become a reality.

In December 2007, federal funding from the U.S. Department of Energy for the Pella location was rescinded, in a form of $50 million.

In August 2008, when asked if any efforts would be made to get additional federal money for the project, U.S. Senator Chuck Grassley said "Not by this senator, and I don't think there will be any by other senators." Same year, one of the prospective founders behind this project, Ray Townsend's son, Ted, had pledged $32.9 million of his own money.

== Size and scope ==
The total project cost for Earthpark was estimated to be $155 million, though over a third of that financial demand was met. The complex was planned to be 3.5 acres (14,000 m^{2}) in area with a 600,000 gallon aquarium and outdoor wetland and prairie exhibits.

The Earthpark project was expected to employ 150 people directly and create an additional 2000 indirect jobs. The economic impact was estimated to be US$130 million annually. The park was projected to draw 1 million visitors annually to the Pella area.
