= Vector Foiltec =

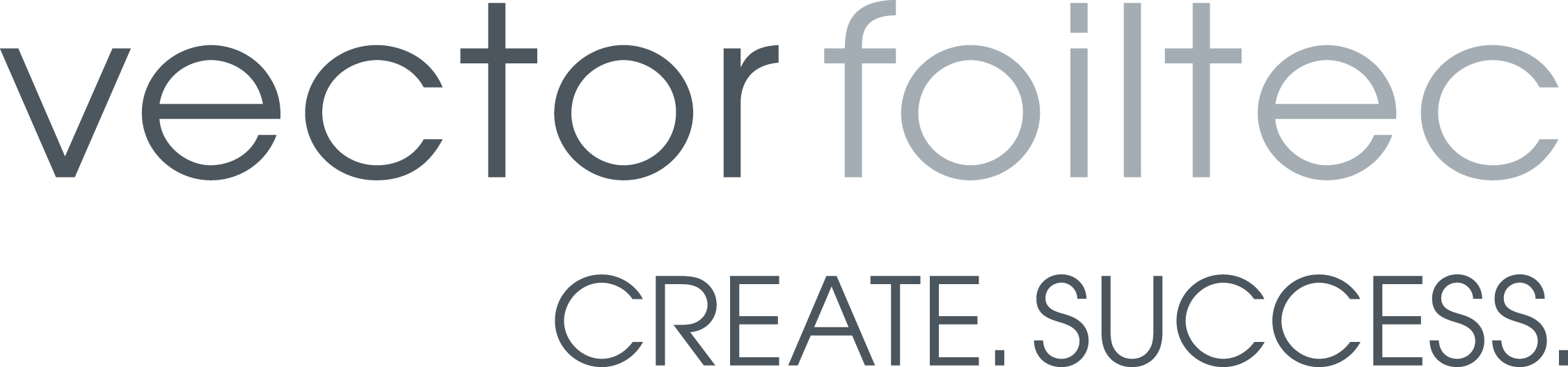
- Type: Private
- Industry: Construction
- Founded: 1982
- Headquarters: Bremen, Germany
- Products: Texlon® ETFE System
- Number of employees: 300
- Website: www.vector-foiltec.com

Vector Foiltec is a business using transparent plastic (ETFE) cushions filled with air as an architectural cladding technology. This solution can be better than glass panels in applications such as roofs over aggressive environments where chemicals would attack a metal window frame, or where the transparent panels have to accommodate deformation due to changing thermal conditions.

== History ==
The Company was founded by Stefan Lehnert in 1982 in Bremen, Germany. Its first structure was the roof of a small pavilion at Burgers' Zoo in 1982.

== Operations ==
The Texlon ETFE cladding system developed by the company consists of a number of layers of the UV stable copolymer ethylene tetrafluoroethylene (ETFE) welded into cushions or foils. The cushions are restrained around their perimeter by aluminium extrusions, which are in turn fastened to a supporting primary structure. The cushions are inflated with air at low pressure to provide insulation and to resist wear caused by wind.

A Texlon ETFE cushion typically consists of two layers, although more layers can be added to enhance the cladding's insulation properties. Each layer can be modified with a variety of treatments to alter its aesthetic quality, its apparent transparency, and the level of solar gain. The material's innate toughness, resistance to tearing, and ability to work harden over a 300-400% elongation range allow Texlon to endure significant deformation of its support structure.

== Major projects ==
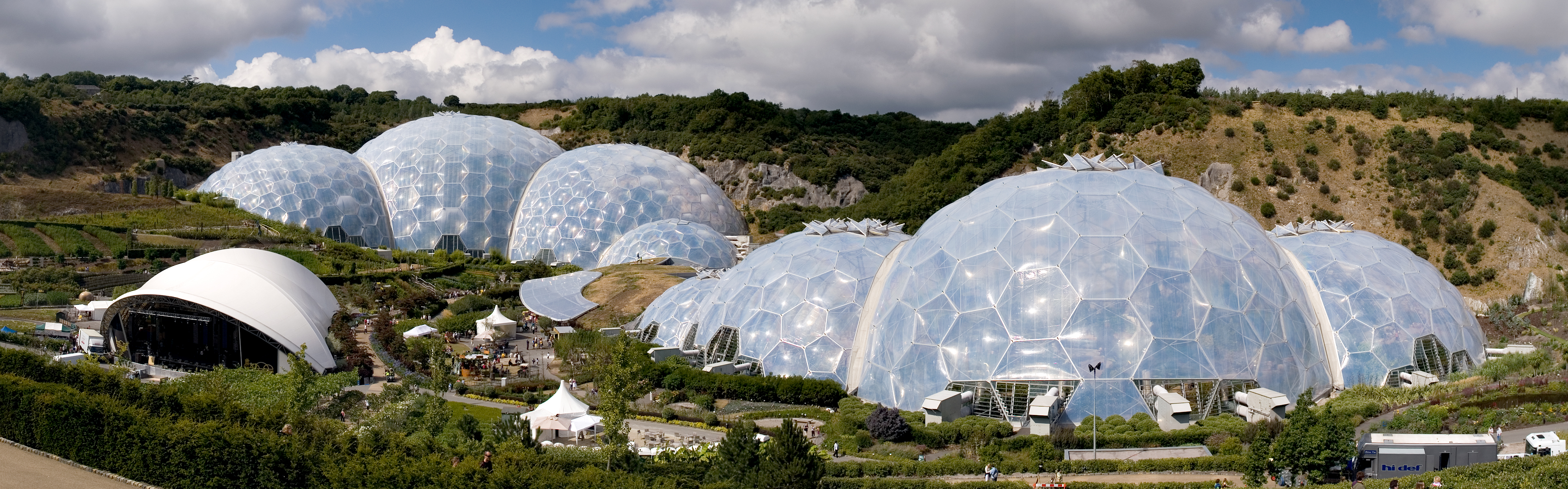
Panoramic view of the geodesic biome domes at the Eden Project

Major projects include:

- Eden Project, UK, completed 2001
- Art Center College of Design, California, completed 2004
- Southern Cross station, Australia, completed 2006
- Beijing National Aquatics Centre, China, completed 2007
- Eden Park, Auckland, New Zealand, completed 2010
- Gondwanaland at Zoo Leipzig, completed 2010
- Forsyth Barr Stadium, Dunedin, New Zealand, completed 2011
- San Mamés Stadium, Bilbao, Spain, completed 2014
- Anaheim Regional Transportation Intermodal Center, Anaheim, California, completed 2014
- Singapore Sports Hub, Singapore, completed 2014
- U.S. Bank Stadium, Minneapolis, completed 2016
- The Avenues (Kuwait), Kuwait, 74,500 m² of Texlon ETFE, completed 2018
- Allegiant Stadium, Las Vegas, completed 2020
- Surbana Jurong Campus, Singapore, completed 2023
