= Clara Mann =

British singer-songwriter

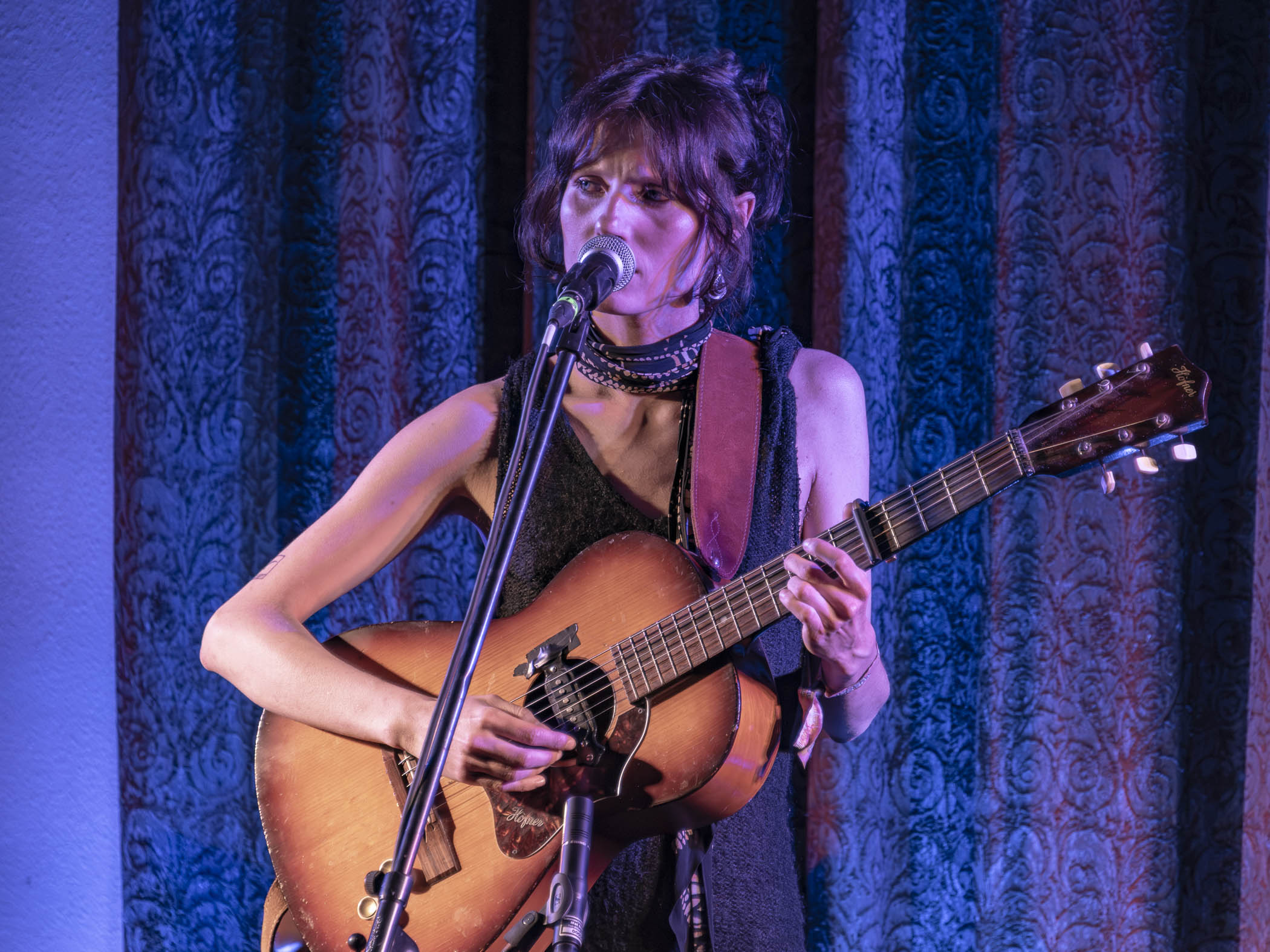
- Clara Mann, performing at The Great Escape Festival in Brighton, 15 May 2025

Background information
- Origin: London, England
- Genre: Folk
- Occupation: Singer-songwriter

Clara Mann is a British singer-songwriter. She released her debut album Rift on state51 in March 2025. Her second album, Wishbone was released on 23 October 2026.

== Early life ==
Mann was raised in a village in the south of France. Church was an important part of the community, which eventually paved the way for her to develop an appreciation for choral music, as well as the chanson tradition of Jacques Brel and Edith Piaf. She and her family then moved to a village near Cheddar Gorge in Somerset, England.

== Music ==
As a teenager, Mann started going to DIY shows in Bristol, where she was exposed to more alternative and contemporary musical influences, and from there experimented with songwriting, switching from piano to the guitar as her primary instrument. She caught the attention of Sad Club Records when she uploaded a few demos on Bandcamp. They eventually released her debut EP, Consolations, in 2021. Mann followed it up with the Stay Open EP in November 2022. Daniel Rossen of Grizzly Bear produced and contributed to "Confessions".

Mann released her debut album, Rift, via state51 on 7 March 2025.. The album was widely praised by critics, with Thomas Blake stating "In the space of a debut album, Clara Mann has gone from ‘one to watch’ to one of the best songwriters in the country," and with frequent comparisons made to songwriting greats; "Undoubtedly, Clara Mann is influenced by an older generation of singer-songwriters: Molly Drake, Judee Sill, Bridget St John, and Iris Dement. These are some of the cultural touchstones you will hear in Mann's music—but they don't capture the full scope of her artistry."

Mann's second album titled Wishbone was announced on the 28th of July, little more than a year after Rift's release, and subsequently released again on state51.

The album was well recieved by critics once more, with The Times rating the record 4/5 and describing Mann's ability to "make falling in love sound like the most devastating thing possible", Rolling Stone describing it as "A record that comes to terms with, and delights in, the idea of growing into yourself as you age" and Mojo (magazine), with another 4/5 reviews saying "Clara Mann has a beautiful voice and delivery that's reminiscent of Bridget St John, slightly throwaway but intense, alternating between easy folk pop and emotionally fraught ballads. Every instrument on this sparse album has warm resonance, whether it's finger-picked guitar, winding piano or rich, dark cello and viola."

As part of the campaign, Mann performed live sessions on BBC Radio 2 for Mark Radcliffe (radio broadcaster) and on BBC Radio 4 for Loose Ends (radio programme) with Stuart Maconie. She also undertook a headline tour, for the first time accompanied by a band, to venues including London's St Matthias' Church, Stoke Newington and Manchester's Hallé at St Michael's.

== Live performances ==
Mann has been chosen by a wide array of artists to support them on European tours including Daniel Rossen of Grizzly Bear, Bill Ryder-Jones, Youth Lagoon, Bat for Lashes and most recently Ben Howard, who she also joined as part of his band for his arena shows with Zach Bryan.
