= Ray T. Townsend =

American inventor and engineer

Ray T Townsend (May 27, 1913 – April 2, 2011) was an American inventor and engineer who transformed the meat processing world with his invention of the pork skinner, sausage linking machine and pork belly injector. All three inventions are still used throughout the world today.

== Background ==
Born in 1913 in Des Moines, Iowa, Ray Townsend trained as a blacksmith in his father's shop during his youth. Following his graduation from East High School he attended Iowa State College in Ames IA for a mechanical engineering degree in 1934. After two years he was unable to afford tuition and went back to work for the family's business – Star Machine Stop in Des Moines. He then went on to found meat and food processing equipment manufacturer Townsend Engineering, in 1946 which he was a part of until his death in 2011. The firm is now owned by the food processing company Marel.

== Inventions ==
=== Pork skinning ===
In 1945 Townsend was working at his father's machine shop. During a visit to a Des Moines area food processor he noticed the arduous and treacherous work needed to loosened skin from hams and pork bellies. "I couldn't imagine how anyone could spend all that time getting a little hunk of skin off," he recalled many years later. "It was an awful way for those women to make a living. I thought anything would be better than what they were doing." He began to work on an idea for removing pork rind mechanically. After nearly a year of trial and error, he perfected the machine, got it patented, and introduced the Townsend Model 27 Pork Skinner in 1946. By 1947 the company sold skinning machines to 550 packing plants in the U.S. and worldwide. Townsend forged ahead with technological advancements in skinning for the next 60 years. The Model 52A was introduced 1953 as the world's first mechanical pork belly skinner. The Townsend Model 800 Belly Skinner, the world's first automatic conveyorized skinner was introduced in 1969.

=== Sausage Linkers ===
In 1960, Townsend turned his attention to the process of making hot dogs. As late as 1960 packers were turning out no more than 500 hot dogs an hour and they were not uniform weight or size. Townsend set out to find a better way, his "Frank-a-Matic", a machine that virtually eliminated waste and made hot dogs at a rate of 36,000 an hour. Three years after its introduction, the Townsend Frank-a-Matic DB series made over 90% of all skinless sausages in the world.

=== Injectors ===
Next for Townsend was the cumbersome process of curing and flavoring pork bellies for bacon. In 1974 he found a better way by using 175 hollow needles; the Townsend Injector distributed precise levels of cure evenly throughout the product. Within 2 years of its introduction, 80% of the bacon processing industry had Townsend Injectors in their plants. (According to company documents)

== Personal life ==
He married Cleda Roberts in 1934 and stayed married until her death in 2002. Ray and Cleda had a daughter, Sherry, in 1937 and a son, Ted, in 1948. They also had three grandchildren.

== Anecdotes ==
- According to his son Ted Townsend, his Favorite number was 127, the number of patents he held. Later in life he couldn't tell you what it was for, but he still knew it was his favorite number.
- The Frank-a-Matic was so popular even in the 1960s Russia bought 100 of the machines
- At its peak, Townsend Engineering employed over 350 people
- The Iowa Historical Building has displayed an original DB1 Frank-a-Matic Linker along with a fish skinner and pork skinner

== Company History ==
- 1946 Townsend engineering was established and the first Model 27 Skinner was sold
- 1953 Townsend Model 52A worlds’ first mechanical pork belly skinner
- 1964 DB 1 Frank-a-Matic Linker world's first high speed cellulose casing linker
- 1969 Townsend Model 800 world's first totally automatic and conveyor-fed skinning machine
- 2001 Townsend Engineering acquired Protecon-Langen
- 2005 Stork Food Systems and Townsend Engineering entered into an agreement for Stork to purchase Townsend.
- 2007 Marel Food Systems purchases Stork Townsend
- 2016 Marel's Des Moines offices move to new location in downtown Des Moines Iowa

== Honors ==
- 1953 – American Meat Institutes Award for greatest contributions to the meat industry in the past 10 years
- 1978 – Charter member of the Iowa Inventors Hall of Fame
- 1982 – Iowa State University's Professional Achievement Award in Engineering
- 2005 - Iowa State University's Henry A. Wallace Award
- 2009 – Meat Industry Hall of Fame inductee
- Over 100 US Patents and 300 international patents
