= ETFE =

Names
- IUPAC name poly(1,1,2,2-tetrafluorobutane-1,4-diyl)
- Other names poly(ethene-co-tetrafluoroethene)

Identifiers
CAS Number	25038-71-5
ChemSpider	none
CompTox Dashboard (EPA)	DTXSID10880370
- InChI: InChI=1S/C2F4.C2H4/c3-1(4)2(5)6;1-2/h;1-2H2 Key: QHSJIZLJUFMIFP-UHFFFAOYSA-N
- Except where otherwise noted, data are given for materials in their standard state (at 25 °C [77 °F], 100 kPa). verify (what is ?) Infobox references

Ethylene tetrafluoroethylene (ETFE) is a fluorine-based plastic. It was designed to have high corrosion resistance and strength over a wide temperature range. ETFE is a polymer, and its source-based name is poly (ethene-co-tetrafluoroethene). It is also known under the DuPont brand name Tefzel and is sometimes referred to as "Teflon Film". ETFE has a relatively high melting temperature and excellent chemical, electrical, and high-energy-radiation resistance properties. It is used in modern architecture, such as the primary material for skylit roofing in indoor sports stadiums and venues.

== Properties ==
Useful comparison tables of PTFE against FEP, PFA, and ETFE can be found on Chemours' website, listing the mechanical, thermal, chemical and electrical properties of each, side by side. ETFE is effectively the high-strength version of the other three in this group.

ETFE film is self-cleaning (due to its nonstick properties) and recyclable. As a film for roofing, it can be stretched and still be taut if some variation in size, such as that caused by thermal expansion, were to occur. Employing heat welding, tears can be repaired with a patch or multiple sheets assembled into larger panels.

ETFE has an approximate tensile strength of 42 megapascals (6,100 psi), with a working temperature range of 89 to 423 K (−184 to 150 °C; −299 to 302 °F).

ETFE resins are resistant to ultraviolet light. An artificial weathering test (comparable to 30 years' exposure) produced no filtering and almost no signs of film deterioration.

ETFE systems can control light transmission through the application of plasma coatings, varnishes, or printed frit patterns. Thermal and acoustic insulation can be incorporated into an ETFE structure via the use of multi-layer systems, using low-pressure air pumps to create ETFE "cushions". For instance, the u values of single, double, and triple layers of ETFE are approximately 5.6, 2.5 and 1.9 W/m^{2}·K respectively, while the g value of ETFE cushions or SHGC in ETFE systems can vary between 0.2 to 0.95 using frits.

== Applications ==
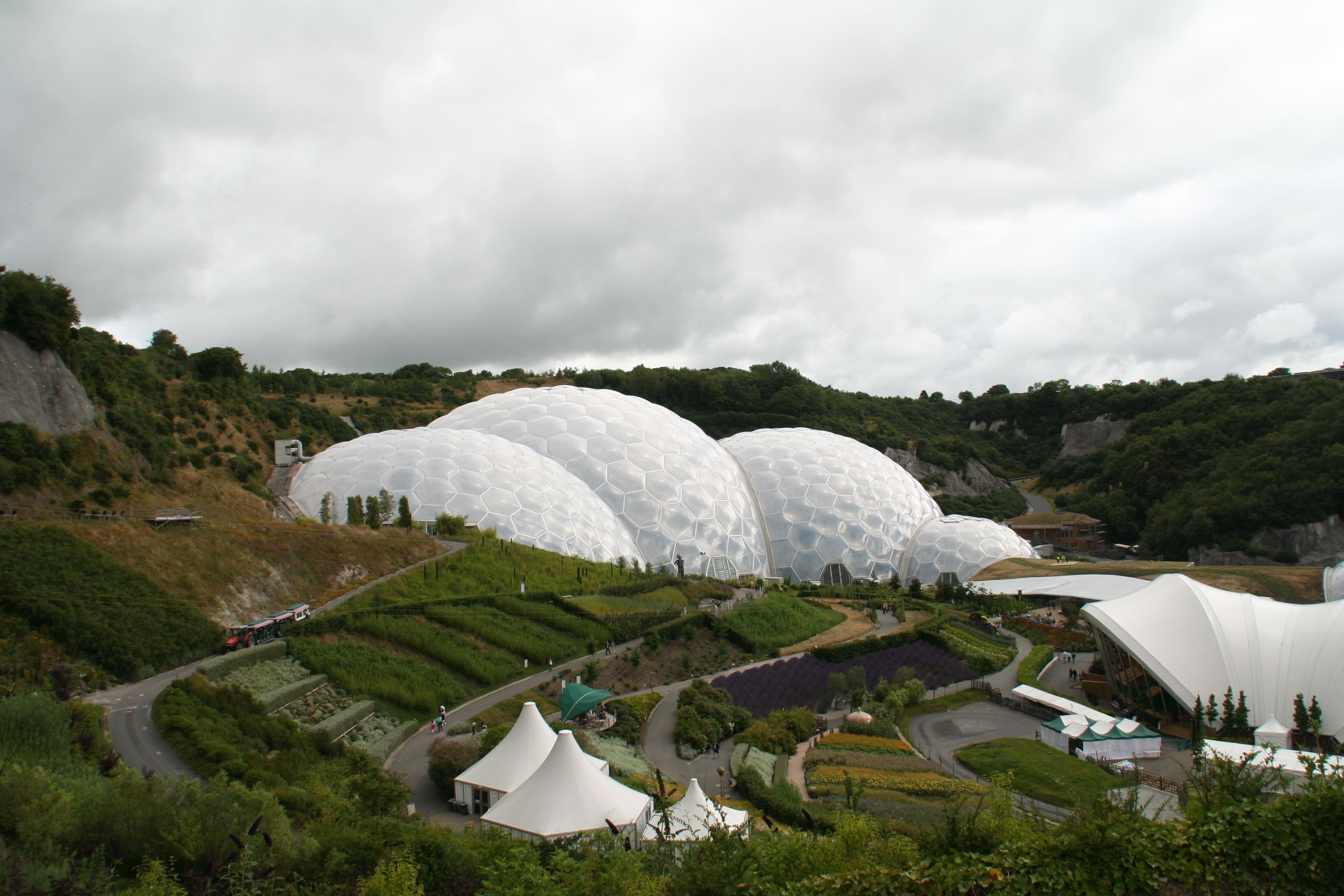
The Eden Project, Cornwall, England. Biomes are constructed with ETFE cushions.

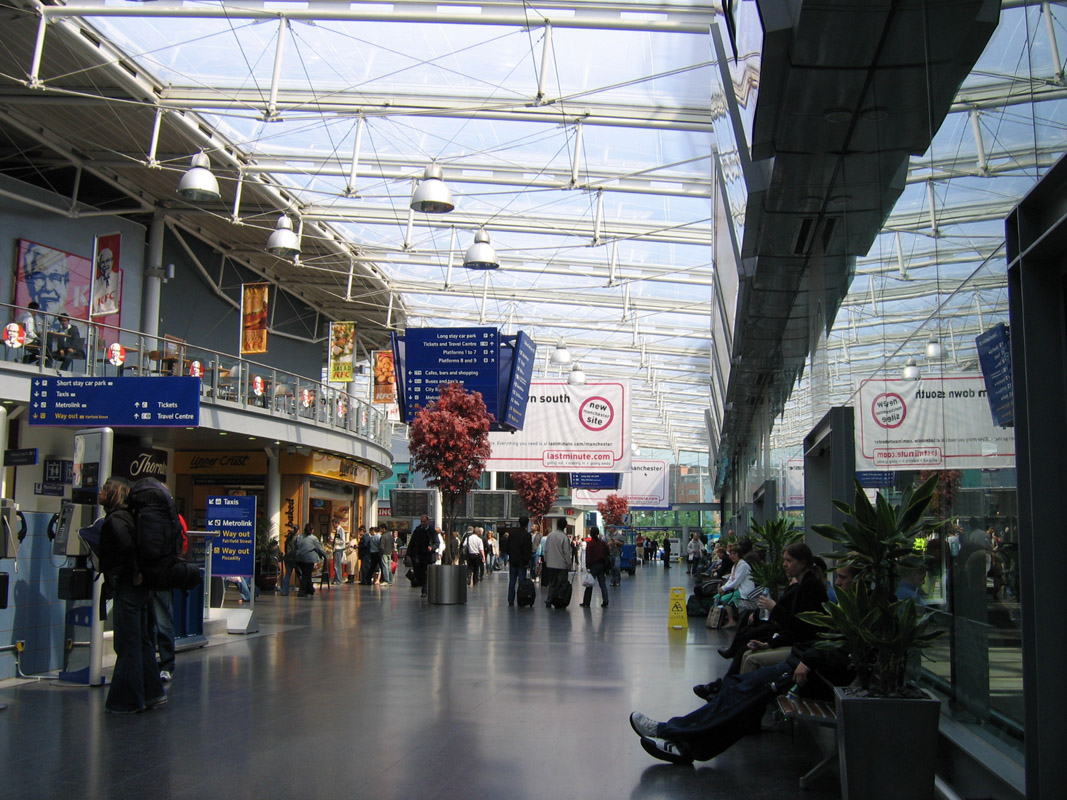
ETFE roof at Manchester Piccadilly station, Manchester, UK

ETFE was developed by DuPont in the 1970s initially as a lightweight, heat-resistant film in the aerospace industry. From its development, it was largely used infrequently in agricultural and architectural projects. ETFE's first large-scale use architecturally came in 2001 at the Eden Project, where ETFE was selected because it can be printed and layered to control solar conditions and because it was found to have a low friction coefficient, which saves on maintenance as dust and dirt do not stick.

An example of its use is as pneumatic panels to cover the outside of the football stadium Allianz Arena or the Beijing National Aquatics Centre (the Water Cube of the 2008 Olympics) – the world's largest structure made of ETFE film (laminate). The panels of the Eden Project are also made from ETFE, and the Tropical Islands have a 20,000 m^{2} window made from this translucent material.

Another key use of ETFE is for the covering of electrical and fiber-optic wiring used in high-stress, low-fume-toxicity and high-reliability situations. Aircraft, spacecraft, and motorsport wiring are primary examples. Some small-cross-section wires like the wire used for the wire-wrap technique are coated with ETFE.

As a dual laminate, ETFE can be bonded with FRP as a thermoplastic liner and used in pipes, tanks, and vessels for additional corrosion protection.

ETFE is commonly used in the nuclear industry for tie or cable wraps and in the aviation and aerospace industries for wire coatings. This is because ETFE has better mechanical toughness than PTFE. In addition, ETFE exhibits a high-energy-radiation resistance and can withstand moderately high temperatures for a long period. Commercially deployed brand names of ETFE include Tefzel by DuPont, Fluon by Asahi Glass Company, Neoflon ETFE by Daikin, and Texlon by Vector Foiltec. Sumitomo Electric developed an aluminium-ETFE composite marketed as Sumiflon-E (スミフロンE). Additionally, the commercial use of architectural ETFE as a skylight or facade material has become popular all over the world.

Due to its high temperature resistance, ETFE is also used in film mode as a mold-release film. ETFE film offered by Guarniflon or Airtech International and Honeywell is used in aerospace applications such as carbon fiber pre-preg curing as a release film for molds or hot high-pressure plates.

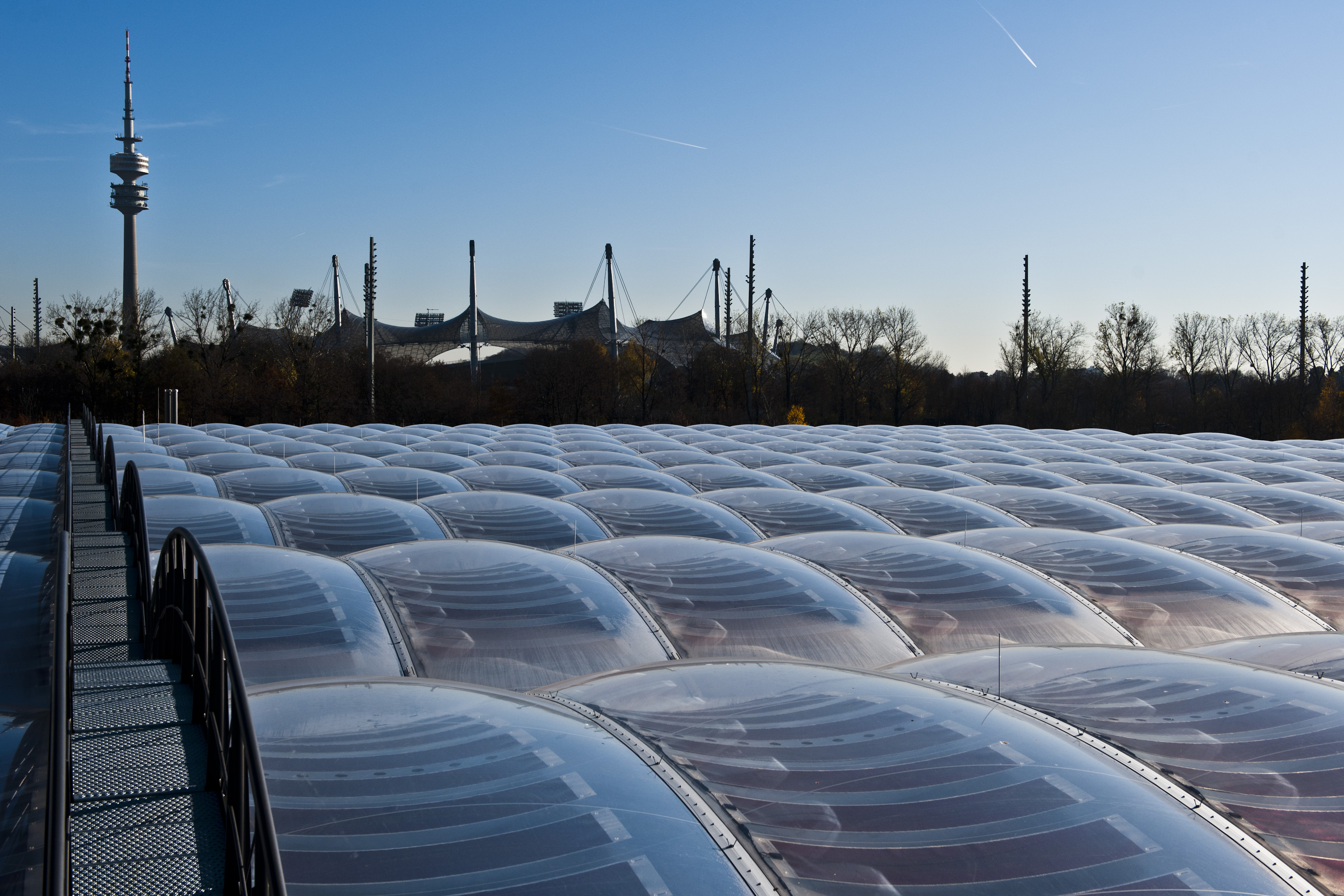
ETFE cushions roof with integrated photovoltaic cells. Munich's municipal waste management department

== Notable buildings ==
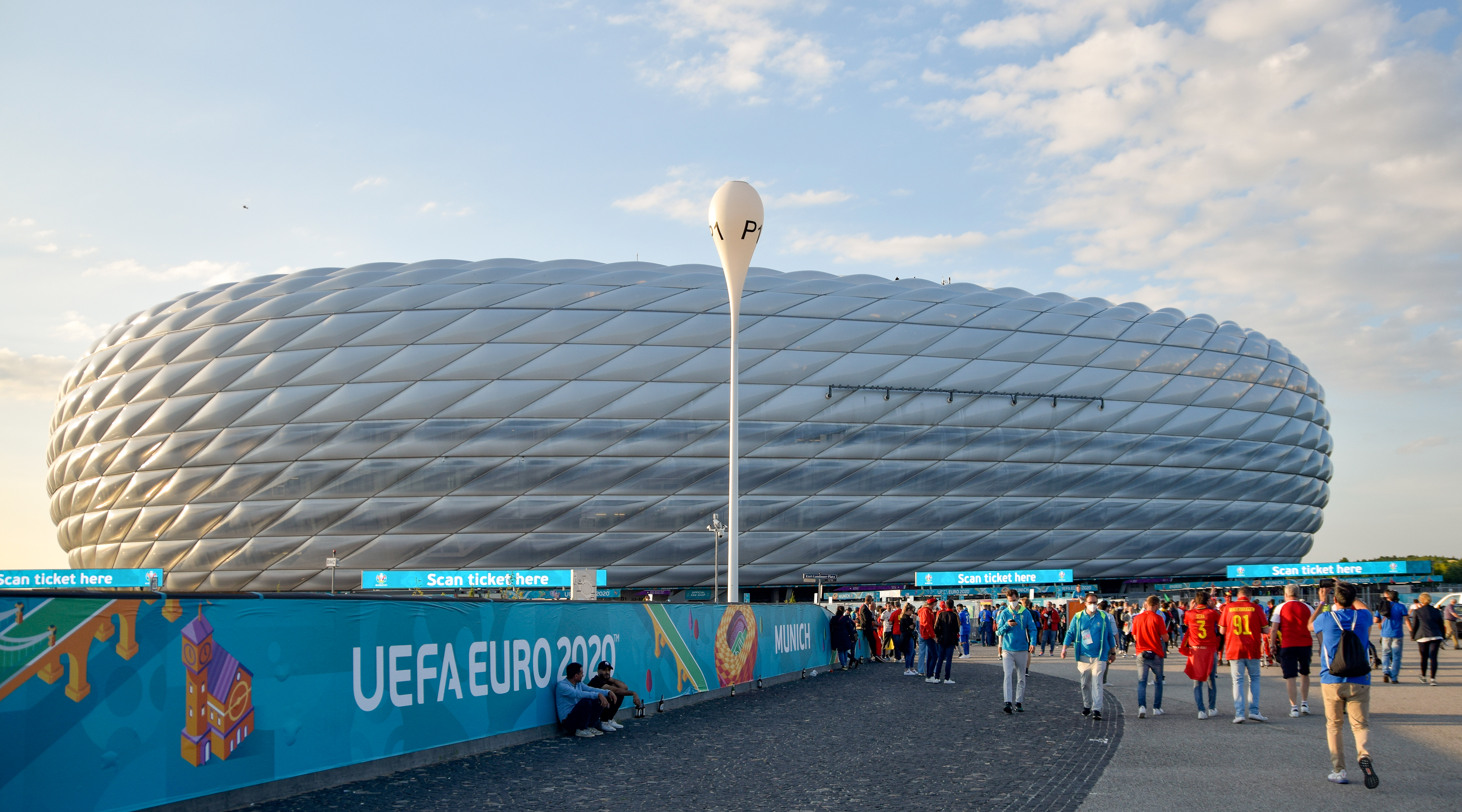
Allianz Arena

Notable buildings and designs using ETFE as a significant architectural element:

- Allianz Arena, Munich, Germany
- Beijing National Aquatics Centre, (the Water Cube) Beijing, China
- Eden Project, Cornwall, United Kingdom
- Khan Shatyr Entertainment Center, Astana, Kazakhstan

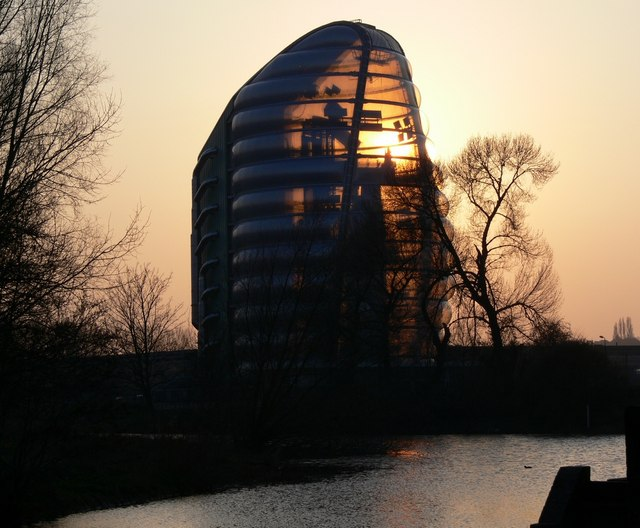
National Space Centre, Leicester UK

- National Space Centre, Leicester, United Kingdom
- Cuauhtémoc Stadium, Puebla, Mexico
- Midland Metropolitan University Hospital, Smethwick, Birmingham, United Kingdom
- U.S. Bank Stadium, Minneapolis, Minnesota, United States
- SoFi Stadium. Inglewood, California, United States
- Allegiant Stadium, Las Vegas, Nevada, United States
- Hard Rock Stadium, Miami Gardens, Florida, United States
- Banc of California Stadium. Los Angeles, California, United States
- BC Place, Vancouver, Canada,

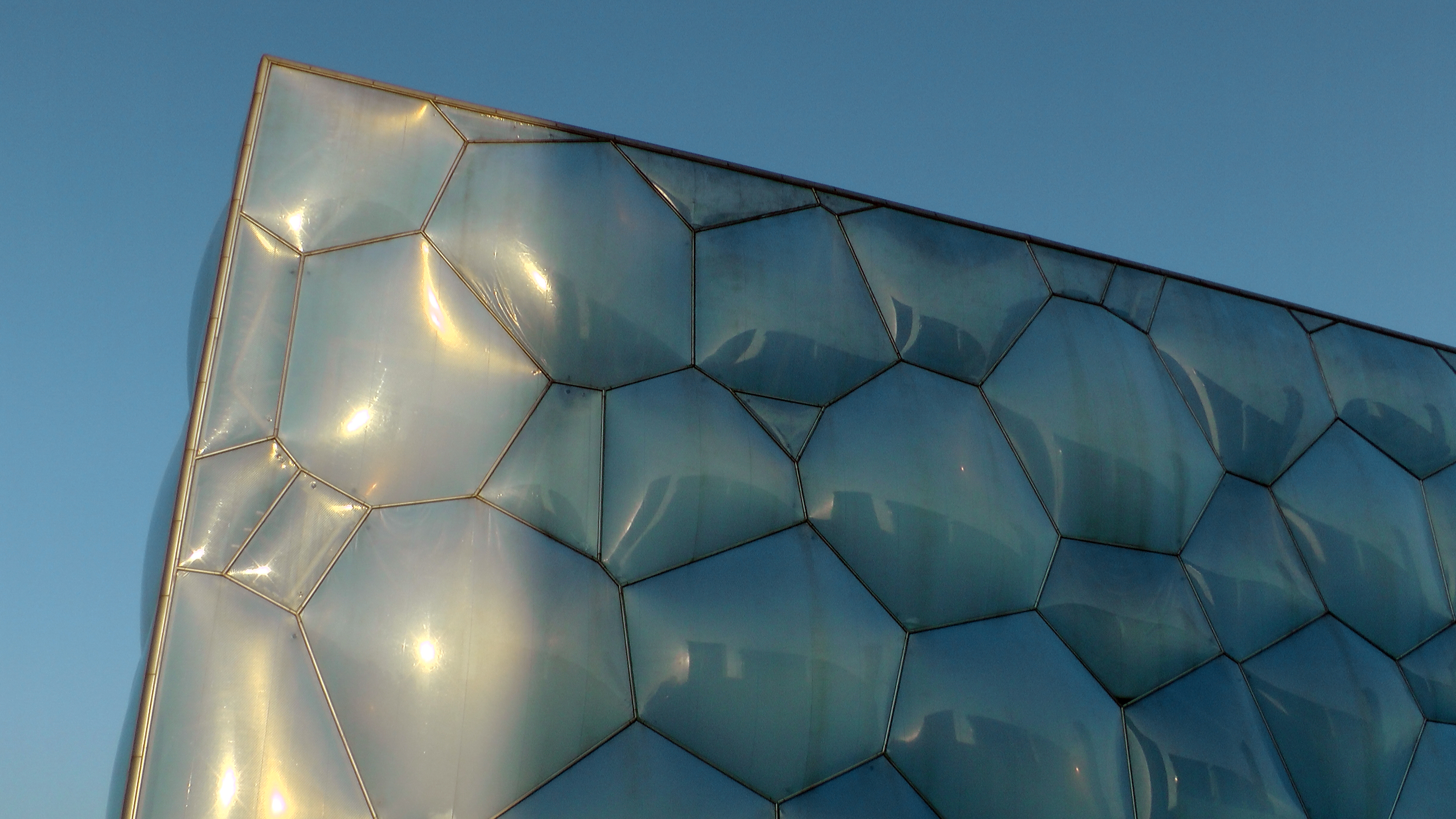
Detail of Beijing National Aquatics Centre showing ETFE exterior cushions

- Beijing National Stadium, Beijing, China
- Forsyth Barr Stadium at University Plaza, Dunedin, New Zealand
- Tanaka Business School, London, United Kingdom

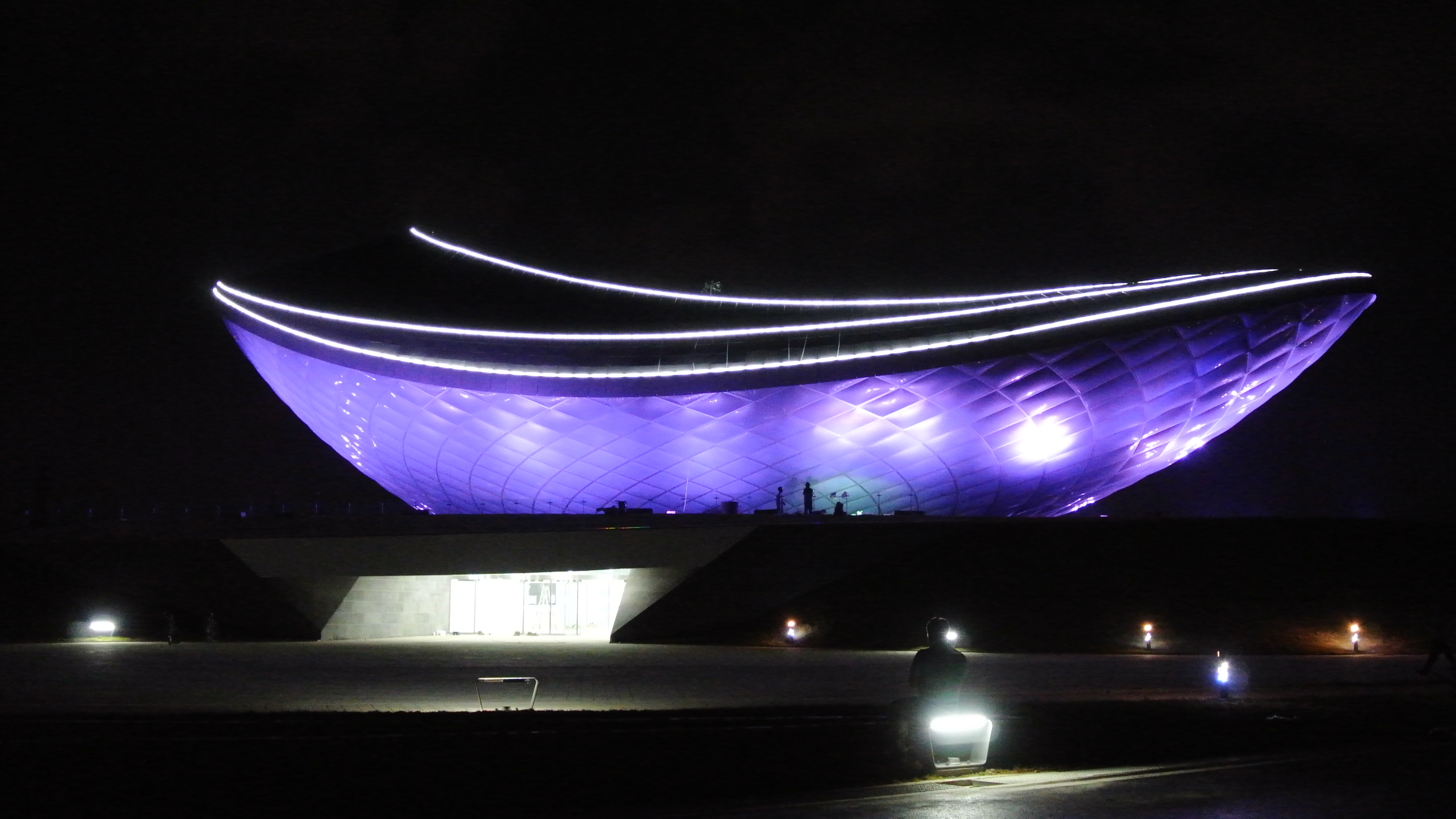
ETFE Facade with integrated LED Lights

- The Shed (Hudson Yards), Manhattan, New York, United States
- Tropical Islands, Brandenburg, Germany
- Barnsley Interchange, Barnsley, United Kingdom
- The Mall Athens, Athens, Greece
- The Elements, Livingston, United Kingdom
- Experimental Media and Performing Arts Center, Troy, New York, United States
- Arena Pernambuco, Recife, Brazil
- Sandton City, Sandton, South Africa
- Masdar City, Abu Dhabi, United Arab Emirates
- The SSE Hydro, Glasgow, Scotland
- Anaheim Regional Transportation Intermodal Center, California (12-13-14)
- National Stadium, Singapore
- Guangzhou South Railway Station, China
- Yujiapu Railway Station, China
- Anoeta Stadium, San Sebastián, Spain
- Mercedes-Benz Stadium, Atlanta, Georgia

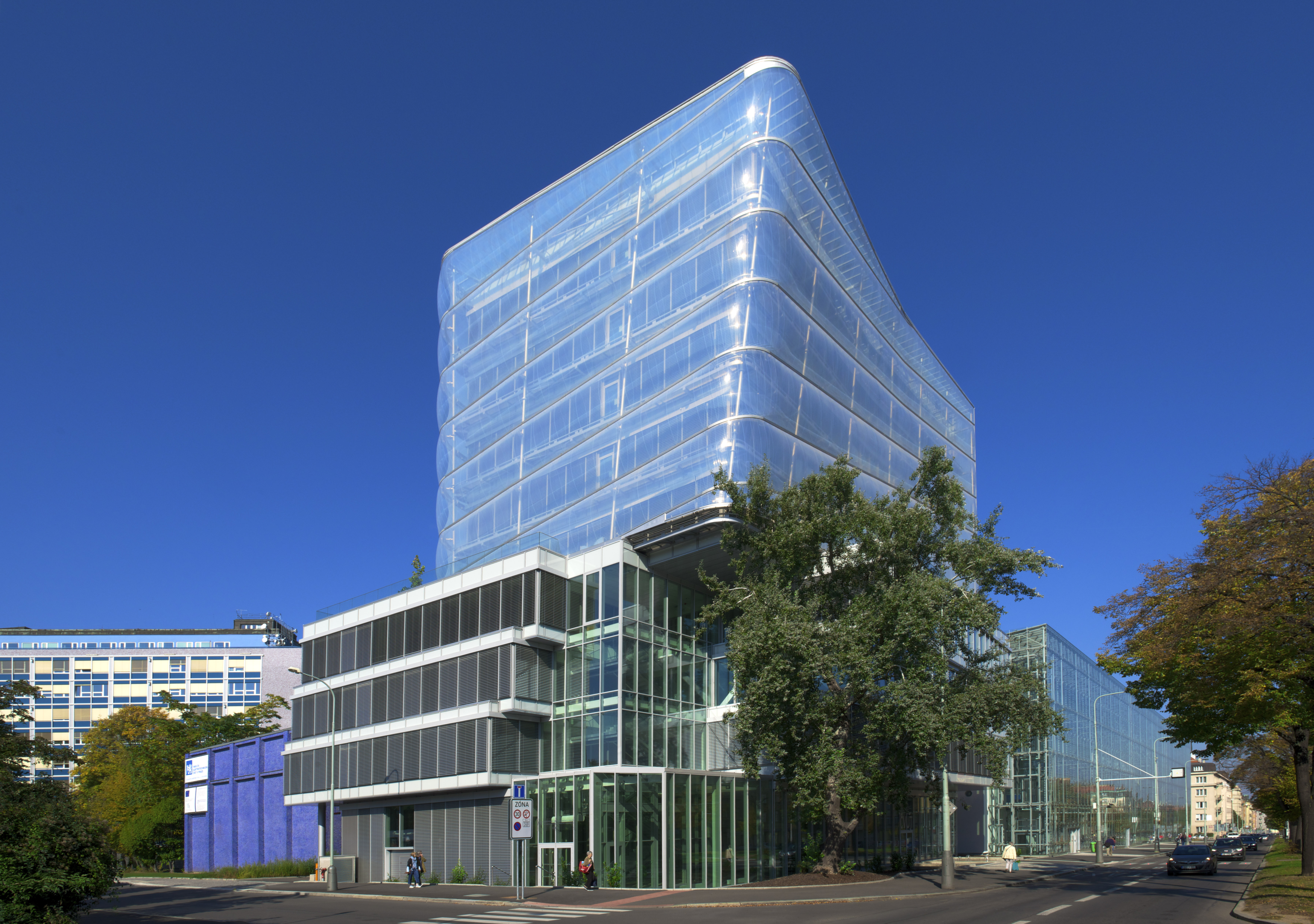
Czech Institute of Informatics, Robotics and Cybernetics in Prague has an ETFE-made façade.

- Czech Institute of Informatics, Robotics and Cybernetics, Prague, Czech Republic (2017)
- Tron Lightcycle Power Run, Shanghai Disneyland, China

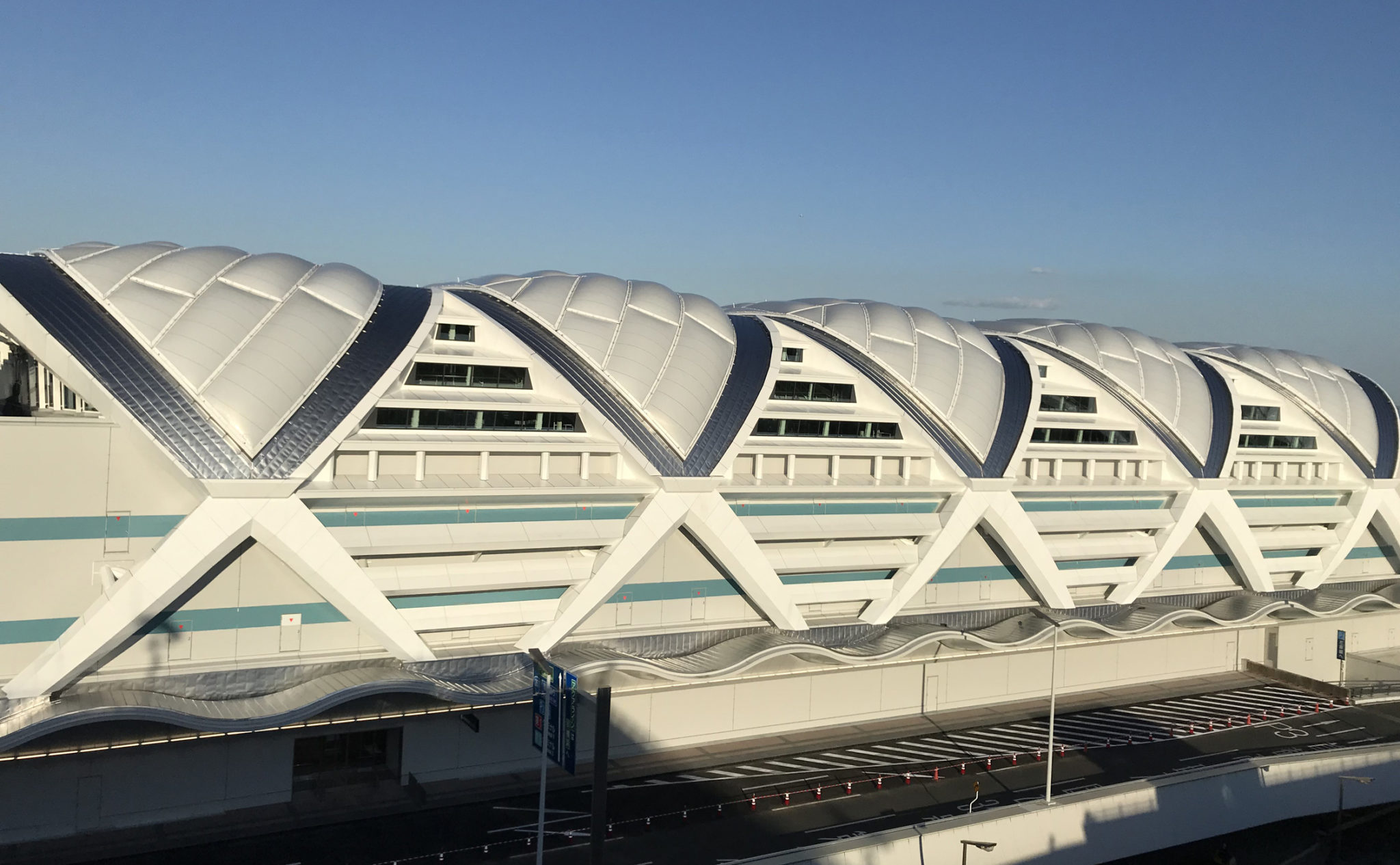
Haneda Airport Terminal 2, International Flight Facilities, Tokyo, Japan

- Hayward Field, University of Oregon, Eugene, Oregon (2020)

=== Under construction ===
- Baku Olympic Stadium, Baku, Azerbaijan
- Australian Embassy, Jakarta, Indonesia
- Jakarta International Stadium, Jakarta, Indonesia
- Tron Lightcycle Power Run, Walt Disney World, United States
- One New Zealand Stadium (Te Kaha), Christchurch, New Zealand
- Macquarie Point Stadium, Hobart, Australia
