= 2015 Webby Awards =

US internet awards ceremony

The 19th annual Webby Awards for 2015 was held at Cipriani Wall Street in New York City on May 19, 2015, which was hosted by comedian and actor Hannibal Buress. The awards ceremony was streamed live at the Webby Awards webpage. Judges from the International Academy of Digital Arts and Sciences picked the over one hundred winners, which may or may not match the people's choice.

The Webby for Lifetime Achievement was awarded to Wired magazine co-founders Louis Rossetto and Jane Metcalfe for shaping how the world thinks about technology.

== Nominees and winners ==
(from http://winners.webbyawards.com/2015)

Category	Webby Award winner	People's Voice winner	Other nominees
Lifetime Achievement	Louis Rossetto and Jane Metcalfe		
Special Achievement	ALS Ice Bucket Challenge		
Special Achievement	Jerome Jarre		
Outstanding Comedic Performance	Chelsea Peretti		
Best Actress	Ellie Kemper		
Best Actor	Tituss Burgess		
Best Drama, Individual Short or Episode	Kept Man		
Breakout of the Year	Tinder		
Agency of the Year	Leo Burnett Toronto		
Mobile Sites & Apps - Music	SoundCloud	Pandora Radio	
Mobile & Apps - Games (Handheld)	Lumosity	Two Dots	
Mobile & Apps - Games (Tablet & All Other Devices)	Monument Valley	Monument Valley	
Mobile & Apps - Lifestyle (Tablet & All Other Devices)	Amikasa	Dogalize	
Online Film & Video - Events & Live Webcasts	The Howard Stern Show Birthday Bash		
Online Film & Video - News & Politics: Individual Episode	VICE Media Russian Roulette: The Invasion of Ukraine (Dispatch Two)		
Online Film & Video - News & Politics: Series	VICE Media Russian Roulette		
Online Film & Video - Video Remixes/Mashups		Apehood	
Video - Comedy Shortform	Rob Cantor: Shia LaBeouf Live		
This table is incomplete, please help to complete it from material on this page.
