= Electric Word =

Netherlands, English language magazine on linguistics (1987–1990)

Electric Word was a bimonthly, English-language magazine published in Amsterdam between 1987 and 1990 that offered eclectic reporting on the translation industry, linguistic technology, and computer culture. Its editor was Louis Rossetto and it featured avant-garde graphics by the Dutch graphic designer Max Kisman.

== History and profile ==
In 1986, Amsterdam-based INK Taalservice, a high-tech translation company serving the new PC industry, launched an English-language magazine, Language Technology, which covered the burgeoning technologies used to process language — from PCs to machine translation to networks. Louis Rossetto was the editor, and Jane Metcalfe was the magazine's ad sales director. The first issue of Language Technology was designed by leading edge Dutch graphic designer Max Kisman. It was the first issue of any magazine to be created with desktop publishing software, in this case ReadySetGo, which Rossetto had carried back from its introduction at that year's San Francisco MacWorld exhibition.

INK later sold the magazine to a small Dutch media company Media Nederland, who renamed it Electric Word. Electric Word's circulation grew to include leading research labs at universities, governments, and high tech companies around the world. Cover subjects were as diverse as computer visionary Alan Kay, AI pioneer Marvin Minsky, Timothy Leary, and MIT Media Lab founder Nicholas Negroponte. Whole Earth Review’s editor Kevin Kelley proclaimed Electric Word "the least boring computer magazine in the world," which became its tagline.

Electric Word was terminated in 1990 due to Media Nederland's change of focus. Rossetto and Metcalfe went on to found Wired magazine. The last issue of Electric Word featured the world's first photoshopped magazine cover — of TED founder Richard Saul Wurman
