= Inevitable =

Inevitable may refer to:

- Inevitable Records, a British independent record label active from 1979 to 1986
- The Inevitable (album), a 1995 album by Squirrel Nut Zippers
- Inevitable (album), a 2013 album by Samo
- Inevitable (Trey Songz EP), 2011
- Inevitable (Super Junior-D&E EP), 2024
- Inevitable (Thud EP), 1993
- "Inevitable" (Dulce María song), 2010
- "Inevitable" (Shakira song), 1999
- "Inevitable", a song by Anberlin on their 2007 album Cities
- "Inevitable", a song by Camilo Séptimo
- "Inevitable", a song by Lauren Daigle on her 2018 album Look Up Child
- "Inevitable", a song by Mushroomhead on their 1999 album M3
- "Inevitable", a song by Poo Bear on his 2018 album Poo Bear Presents Bearthday Music
- "Inevitable", a song by Scissor Sisters on their 2012 album Magic Hour
- Inevitable (book), a 1900 novel by Dutch author Louis Couperus
- The Inevitable, a 2016 nonfiction book about technology trends by US author Kevin Kelly
- Inevitable (Dungeons & Dragons), a magical construct in the Dungeons & Dragons role-playing game
- Al-Waqi'a, "Inevitable", 56th Surah (Chapter) of the Quran

== See also ==
- Unavoidable (disambiguation)
