= Linnean =

Linnean or Linnaean may refer to:

== General ==
- Relating to Swedish biologist Carl Linnaeus

== Linnean ==
- Linnean Society of London
- Linnean Society of New South Wales
- Linnean Medal
- Linnean Tercentenary Medal
- Swedish Linnean Society

== Linnaean ==
- Linnaean enterprise
- Linnaean Garden
- Linnaean Society of New England
- Linnaean Society of New York
- Linnaean taxonomy

== See also ==
- Linnéska institutet
