= Pet-friendly hotels =

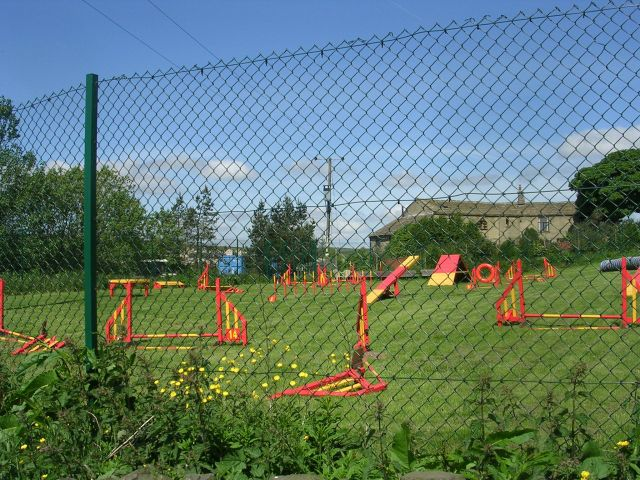
Pets Playground at Morton Villa Peter Hotel, United Kingdom

Pet friendly are hotels which offer a range of amenities designed to accommodate pet owners. In these hotels pet owners get gourmet room service menus for their pets. Examples include, JW Marriott Hotels, Renaissance Hotels, Ritz-Carlton.

== Services ==
In pet friendly hotels, pets get specialized bedding, leashes, collars, and litter boxes; special treats like rawhide bones, catnip, and scratch poles; helpful amenities like dog-walking route maps, water bowls, doggie pick-up bags; and pet walking and pet sitting services. There are also some map services such as Google Maps and Dogalize Maps which help to find pet friendly hotels, restaurants, camping, shopping, parks, beaches.

== See also ==
- Pet-friendly dormitories
