= What Technology Wants =

Book by Kevin Kelly

- First edition
- Author: Kevin Kelly
- Language: English
- Subjects: Culture, Human, Life, Technology
- Publisher: Viking Press
- Publication date: 2010
- Media type: Print (Hardback)
- Pages: 416
- ISBN: 978-0-670-02215-1

What Technology Wants is a 2010 nonfiction book by Kevin Kelly focused on technology as an extension of life.

== Summary ==
The opening chapter of What Technology Wants, entitled "My Question", chronicles an early period in the author's life and conveys a sense of how he went from being a nomadic traveler with few possessions to a co-founder of Wired. The book invokes a giant force – the technium – which is "the greater, global, massively interconnected system of technology vibrating around us".

In November 2014, Kelly gave a SALT talk (Seminars About Long-term Thinking) for the Long Now Foundation titled "Technium Unbound", where he explained and expanded upon the ideas from his books What Technology Wants and Out of Control.

== Criticism ==
Kelly's book has been criticized for espousing a teleological view of biological evolution that is rejected by some scientists, and for promoting a "bizarre neo-mystical progressivism" (by Jerry Coyne).

== Editions ==
- Kevin Kelly. What Technology Wants. New York, Viking Press, October 14, 2010, hardcover, 416 pages. ISBN 978-0-670-02215-1
- Citia iOS iPad Edition, What Technology Wants, released May 2012 by Semi-Linear, Inc.

== See also ==
- Out of Control
- Superorganism
