= Cattery =

Cat boarding or breeding establishment

A cattery is any building, collection of buildings or property in which cats are housed, maintained, cared for, and bred. A cattery can be anything from a simple building associated with a residence to a state-of-the-art facility with CCTV, televisions, and water features. There are two general types of catteries: cat boarding and cat breeding.

== Boarding catteries ==
A boarding cattery or cat boarding is a place where cats are housed temporarily for a fee. Although many people worry about the stress placed on the animal by being put in an unfamiliar environment, most boarding catteries work to reduce stress. Boarding catteries typically have familiar objects, cat trees, climbing frames, scratching posts, and places for the cats to sleep during the day, and blankets and toys from home, are also permitted at many catteries. Some catteries offer onsite grooming and nail trimming.

=== Communal catteries ===
This is often just a room or series of rooms where the cats all mingle together, are fed together and sleep in whatever space they can find. These catteries have the highest number of fights, and can be overcrowded, especially at peak times. Carers cannot monitor cats' eating, and communal toileting, eating and drinking can lead to outbreaks of illness if unchecked, which can be hard to contain. Cats in communal catteries benefit from the much greater space available for roaming and playing. These are usually the cheapest form of boarding cattery.

=== Semi-communal catteries ===
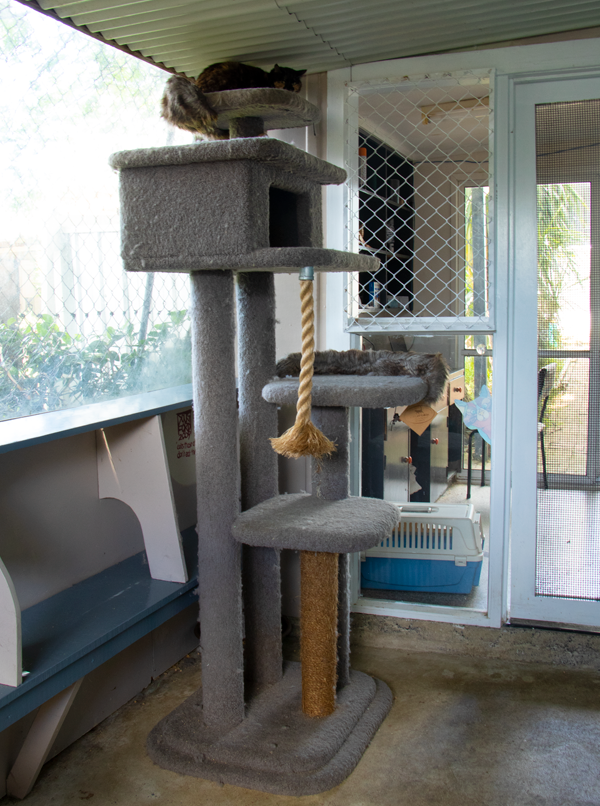
Inside a semi-communal boarding cattery

With individual cages and large play areas, semi-communal catteries are the middle ground between communal and celled catteries. In responsibly managed semi-communal catteries, the cats are fed in cages and separated at night from non-family members. Specific diets can be catered for, medications can be given, and the cats' toileting can be monitored. The play areas of semi-communal catteries can have meshed open-air areas which along with separate animal feeding helps to greatly reduce the transmission of illness, although some are large internal rooms with little ventilation which can negate some of the benefits.

=== Celled catteries ===
The often purpose-built celled catteries house cats in individual cells. Similar to an aviary, they are meshed rooms within a much large facility, usually with one face open to the air. Ventilation is ample, and the transmission of illness is greatly reduced. As with the semi-communal cattery, celled catteries can monitor toileting, feed specialized diets and provide medication when required. There is no chance of cats not familiar with each other intermingling, and the chance of overcrowding is greatly reduced too. These catteries are at the high end of the pricing spectrum.

== Breeding catteries ==
A breeding cattery is a place specialized in breeding valuable pet cats for sale and profit. Unlike traditional pet shops, pet hospitals, or some boarding catteries, breeding catteries do not provide services such as grooming, bathing, or nursing. Most breeding cattery operators use ordinary residential houses as breeding places and can be similar either to communal boarding catteries or celled boarding catteries. Their business operations use specialty websites, online marketplaces, or the pet trading market, and in rare cases they will sell to pet shops.

Licensed breeding catteries are heavily regulated and must follow relevant government legislation. Breed club members are expected to comply with their breed's general ethics code. Clubs may also stipulate criteria to be met before issuing registration papers for kittens bred. A kennel name or kennel prefix is a name associated with each breeding cattery: it is the first part of the registered name of a pedigreed cat which was bred there.

In the United States the term "boarding kennel" can also be used to refer to boarding catteries. Licensing agencies do not always differentiate between commercial boarding kennels for dogs and other animal or cat boarding catteries. In 2007 market surveys showed that $3.0 billion was spent on these services. Annual for US cat owners was $149 according to a 2007–2008 survey.

== See also ==
- Animal shelter
- Pet House

== General and cited references ==
- https://www.justforcatscattery.co.uk/what-is-a-cattery/
- https://www.silvermaplepetcenter.com/what-is-cat-boarding/
- https://dogcatranch.com/cattery-vs-cat-boarding-facility-understanding-the-differences/
