= Tcho =

Tcho can refer to:

- TCHO a craft chocolate company based in Berkeley, California
- Tchô! a French-Belgian comics magazine
