= StattAuto =

German carsharing company

StattAuto CarSharing GmbH
- Company type: GmbH
- Industry: Carsharing
- Founded: 1990
- Fate: Became Greenwheels
- Area served: Germany

StattAuto CarSharing GmbH, headquartered in Berlin, was the first carsharing corporation in Germany and the second worldwide. It changed its name to Greenwheels AG in 2005.

== History ==
Beginning with one old private car in 1988, StattAuto was legally founded as a limited liability company in 1990. In 1998 StattAuto CarSharing GmbH, Berlin, united with StattAuto Hamburger CarSharing GmbH, which was incorporated in Hamburg in 1992, and formed a public limited company (PLC) with nearly 1400 shareholders, most of whom were active customers. In December 2001 StattAuto became the first cooperation partner of Deutsche Bahn and obtained the right to distribute and operate the new carsharing trademark "DB CarSharing" exclusively in Berlin and Hamburg.

In 2004 StattAuto started offering carsharing services in Berlin, Hamburg, Potsdam and Rostock. That year, the largest and most successful carsharing company of the Netherlands, Collect Car B.V., better known under its trademark "Greenwheels," bought the majority of StattAuto shares. At the end of 2005, Greenwheels kept 98.5% of StattAuto shares. In December 2005 the General Assembly of shareholders decided to change the name of the company from "StattAuto CarSharing AG" to "Greenwheels AG."

In June 2005 StattAuto/Greenwheels introduced the most transparent and compact tariff structure ever offered in German carsharing. The former StattAuto tariff had not been offered since that date to new customers. Also in 2005 StattAuto/Greenwheels underlined cooperation contracts with three regional public transport authorities: VBB (Verkehrsverbund Berlin-Brandenburg), HVV (Hamburger Verkehrsverbund), and VVW (Verkehrsverbund Warnow, Rostock). Public transport customers with subscription tickets can use StattAuto/Greenwheels cars without any deposit or monthly fee. The combined mobility of public transport and car-sharing is assumed by StattAuto to be the most economical and ecological traffic concept for urban agglomerations in the future.

StattAuto is a member of Bundesverband CarSharing (also known as the national German Association of CarSharing), which has its headquarters in Hanover. BCS is the lobbying network of nearly all German carsharing companies, tries to improve the political conditions under which carsharing takes place in Germany, and offers car services and insurance for its members. In the year 2005 there were about 85,000 car-sharers in more than 250 towns and communities in Germany using 2500 cars at 1500 locations.

== See also ==
- Greenwheels
