= Kennel =

Shelter of a dog

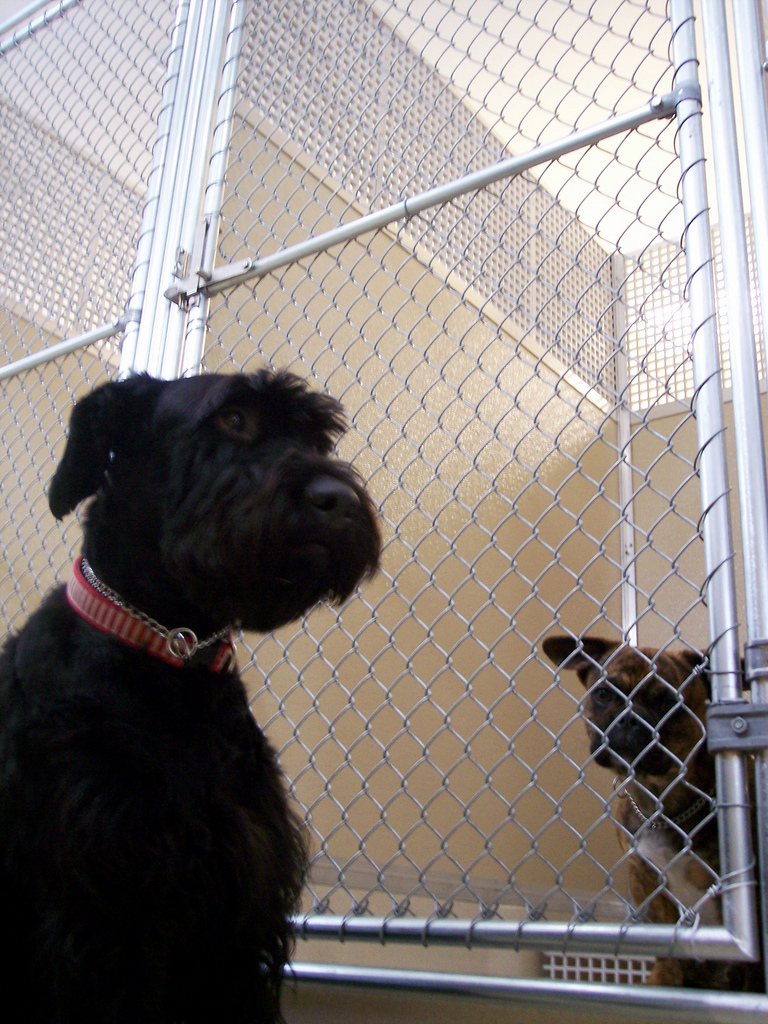
A dog sits in front of a typical kennel panel

A kennel is a structure or shelter for dogs. Used in the plural, the kennels, the term means any building, collection of buildings or a property in which dogs are housed, maintained, and (though not in all cases) bred. A kennel can be made out of various materials, the most popular being wood and canvas. The term "kennel" can also refer to a dog crate or doghouse.

== Breeding kennels ==
This is a formal establishment for the propagation of dogs, whether or not they are actually housed in a separate shed, the garage, a state-of-the-art facility, or the family dwelling. Licensed breeding kennels are heavily regulated and must follow relevant government legislation. Breed club members are expected to comply with the general Code of Ethics and guidelines applicable to the breed concerned. Kennel clubs may also stipulate criteria to be met before issuing registration papers for puppies bred. A kennel name or kennel prefix is a name associated with each breeding kennel: it is the first part of the registered name of a pedigreed dog which was bred there.

According to ASPCA, Although they're required to follow USDA government legislation, these care standards are out of date and only need to comply with minimal standard of care. The minimal standards of care are not good enough, they are just survival standards enough to reproduce.

Even if some licensed breeding kennels meet the "standard of care." There are still many unlicensed puppy mills that fly under the radar to avoid governmental checks. According to humaneworld.org, around 2 million puppies are sold from puppy mills, with only around 700,000 being legally produced.

== Boarding kennels ==
This is a place where dogs are housed temporarily for a fee, an alternative to using a pet sitter. Although many people worry about the stress placed on the animal by being put in an unfamiliar and most likely crowded environment, the majority of boarding kennels work to reduce stress. Many kennels offer one-on-one "play times" in order to get the animal out of the kennel environment. Familiar objects, such as blankets and toys from home, are also permitted at many kennels. Many kennels offer grooming and training services in addition to boarding, with the idea being that the kennel can be the owner's "one-stop shop" for all three services.

In the United States the term boarding kennel can also be used to refer to boarding catteries and licensing agencies do not always differentiate between commercial boarding kennels for dogs and other animal or cat boarding kennels. In 2007 market surveys showed that $3.0 billion was spent on these services. Annual kennel boarding expenses for dog owners was $225, and for cat owners was $149 according to a 2007–2008 survey.

== History ==
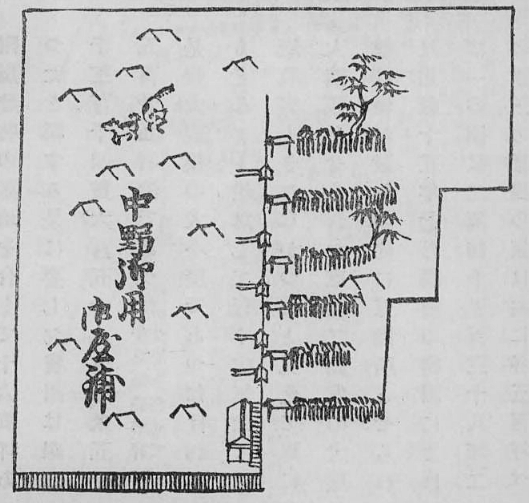
Historic drawing of the Nakano Inugoya (Nakano dog shelters) in 1696, which accommodated around 80,000 stray dogs with an approximately size of 750,000 square meters in 1702.

In Edo period Japan Tokugawa Tsunayoshi had large kennels built in Nakano, Yotsuya and Okubo in Edo (Tokyo). Even during the famine the Shogunate accommodated 80,000 stray dogs in the kennels in Nakano and gave them 3 go (0.18L) of polished rice, 50 moon (187g) of bean paste and 1 go of sardines daily. The total space for the dog shelters in Nakano was approximately 750,000 square meters in 1702.

== See also ==
- Animal shelter
- Dog camp
- Doghouse
- Pet House
