= The Inevitable (book) =

2016 nonfiction book about technology trends

The Inevitable: Understanding the 12 Technological Forces That Will Shape Our Future
- Author: Kevin Kelly
- Language: English
- Subject: Futurology
- Publisher: Viking Press
- Publication date: 2016
- Media type: Print (Hardback)
- Pages: 336
- ISBN: 978-0-525-42808-4

The Inevitable is a 2016 nonfiction book by Kevin Kelly that forecasts the twelve technological forces that will shape the next thirty years.

== Summary ==
According to Kelly, much of what will happen in the next thirty years is inevitable. The future will bring with it even more screens, tracking, and lack of privacy. In the book he outlines twelve trends that will forever change the ways in which we work, learn and communicate: The chapters are organized by these forces.

1. Becoming: Moving from fixed products to always upgrading services and subscriptions
2. Cognifying: Making everything much smarter using cheap powerful AI that we get from the cloud
3. Flowing: Depending on unstoppable streams in real time for everything
4. Screening: Turning all surfaces into screens
5. Accessing: Shifting society from one where we own assets to one where instead we will have access to services at all times
6. Sharing: Collaboration at mass scale. Kelly writes, "On my imaginary Sharing Meter Index we are still at 2 out of 10."
7. Filtering: Harnessing intense personalization in order to anticipate our desires
8. Remixing: Unbundling existing products into their most primitive parts and then recombining in all possible ways
9. Interacting: Immersing ourselves inside our computers to maximize their engagement
10. Tracking: Employing total surveillance for the benefit of citizens and consumers
11. Questioning: Promoting good questions is far more valuable than good answers
12. Beginning: Constructing a planetary system connecting all humans and machines into a global matrix

== Critical response ==
Kirkus Reviews notes that "Kelly’s arguments ring true, and his enthusiasm [about the future] is contagious". Publishers Weekly also highlights that this book reflect Kelly's "optimistic and arguably idealistic view" and that he "chooses to elide discussions of the specific downsides that likely will accompany the changes he describes. Kelly's stated goal is 'to uncover the roots of digital change so that we can embrace them.' The book effectively identifies these roots, but in omitting critical discussion of them, it leaves the reader inadequately equipped to thoughtfully embrace or engage with them."

== See also ==
- Out of Control
- What Technology Wants
