= Eckart Wintzen =

Dutch entrepreneur, venture capitalist, environmentalist, and media arts enthusiast

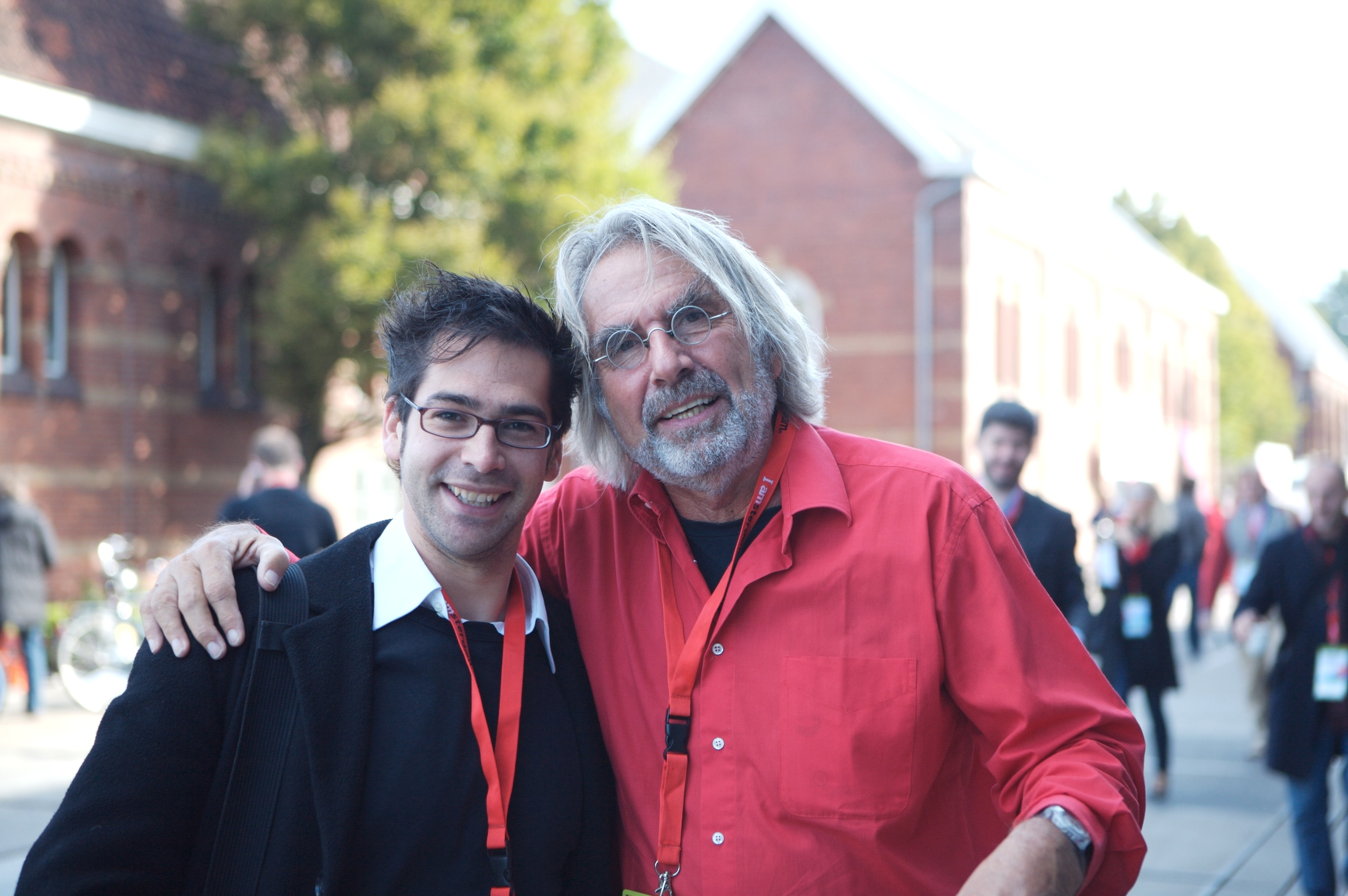
- Eckart Wintzen (right) in 2007
- Born: April 19, 1939
- Died: March 21, 2008 (aged 68); France
- Citizenship: Netherlands
- Education: Leiden University
- Occupations: Entrepreneur; venture capitalist
- Known for: BSO/Origin, Ex'tent, Ex'pression College
- Website: "Ex'tent". Archived from the original on 13 September 2017.

Eckart Wintzen (April 19, 1939 – March 21, 2008) was a Dutch entrepreneur, venture capitalist, and environmentalist. He was known for founding software company BSO/Origin, co-founding Ex'pression College, and contributing to the success of Ben & Jerry's Benelux, Wired, and Greenwheels.

In his own words, he wanted to "put technology at the service of inter-human warmth."

He died of heart failure in 2008, while on vacation in France.

== Early life and education ==
Wintzen was born in a fishing village in Holland, and later studied math and physics at Leiden University.

In the early 1960s, he served a mandatory stint in the Dutch army, where he first developed an interest in computers.

== Business career ==
=== BSO/Origin ===
In 1976, Wintzen founded the software company BSO, which was later renamed Origin. In 1995, the privately held company had 6,500 employees and 100 offices in 24 countries, with global revenues above $500 million. The firm's clients included Volvo, Texaco, Eastman Kodak, Procter & Gamble, and Motorola. In 1996, the company merged with Philips Communications and Processing Services, and ready to move on to other ventures, Wintzen chose not to stay onboard after the merger.

=== Ex'tent ===
After retiring from Origin in 1996, Wintzen decided to put the profits to good use. He founded green venture capital firm Ex'tent, which offered management and financial support to small companies with philanthropic missions.

=== Ex'pression College ===
In 1999, Wintzen co-founded Ex'pression College, a private for-profit college for digital arts, in Emeryville, California. Initially, the school was funded exclusively by Wintzen, who invested roughly $20 million into the project. Wintzen said his support of the school was part of a plan to participate in the "immaterial economy." Along with the management team, Wintzen actively participated in the development of the long-term vision and goals for the school.

=== Advising ===
Eckart advised many entrepreneurs, and served on the boards of commercial and non-profit organizations including the Dianne Fossey Gorilla Fund and the Carbon Disclosure Project.
