= Dogalize =

Social network

- Website type: Social Network
- Available in: English, Spanish and Italian
- Owner: Sara Colnago
- Website: www.dogalize.com
- Registration: Yes
- Users: 350,000
- Current status: active

Dogalize is a social network dedicated to pet animals. It is based in Milan, Italy. The network allows users to geolocate other pet owners and find pet-friendly places. The site has around 350,000 users. It received the Innovation IT award in 2016 from the President of Italy.

== About ==
The social network was founded in 2014 by Sara Colnago. It was started as an experiment in telemedicine, a service allowing owners of pets to video call any available veterinarian. Later they developed the idea of implementing communities and sections dedicated to the kennels, the sponsorship and food banks for pets.

The website allows users to meet other dog owners, chat with them, ask for opinions on veterinary questions or share videos and photos. Around 70% of the users are Italian and the remainder are from Latin American countries. The site also has smartphone app for Android and iOS platforms.

Map services

The company has a map service named "Dogalize Maps", which shows facilities that accept pets as well as pet sitter services and educators near the user. The map currently lists around 30,000 facilities and services. Pet-friendly businesses must sign up as a Dogalize Partner to be listed on the map.

Dogalize Educators

On 5 January 2016, the company released "Dogalize Educators", a free e-book with practical advice for pet owners on how to educate and live with their dogs. It was released on Amazon, Google Play Books platforms, e-Coop libraries, Feltrinelli and Rizzoli.

== Awards ==
- The 2016 Innovation IT award from the Government of Italy.
- Best application in the category "Community & Social" at SMAU 2013.
- 2015 Oscars of the Internet, awarded by the Webby People's Voice.
