= Kevin Kelly (editor) =

American magazine editor (born 1952)

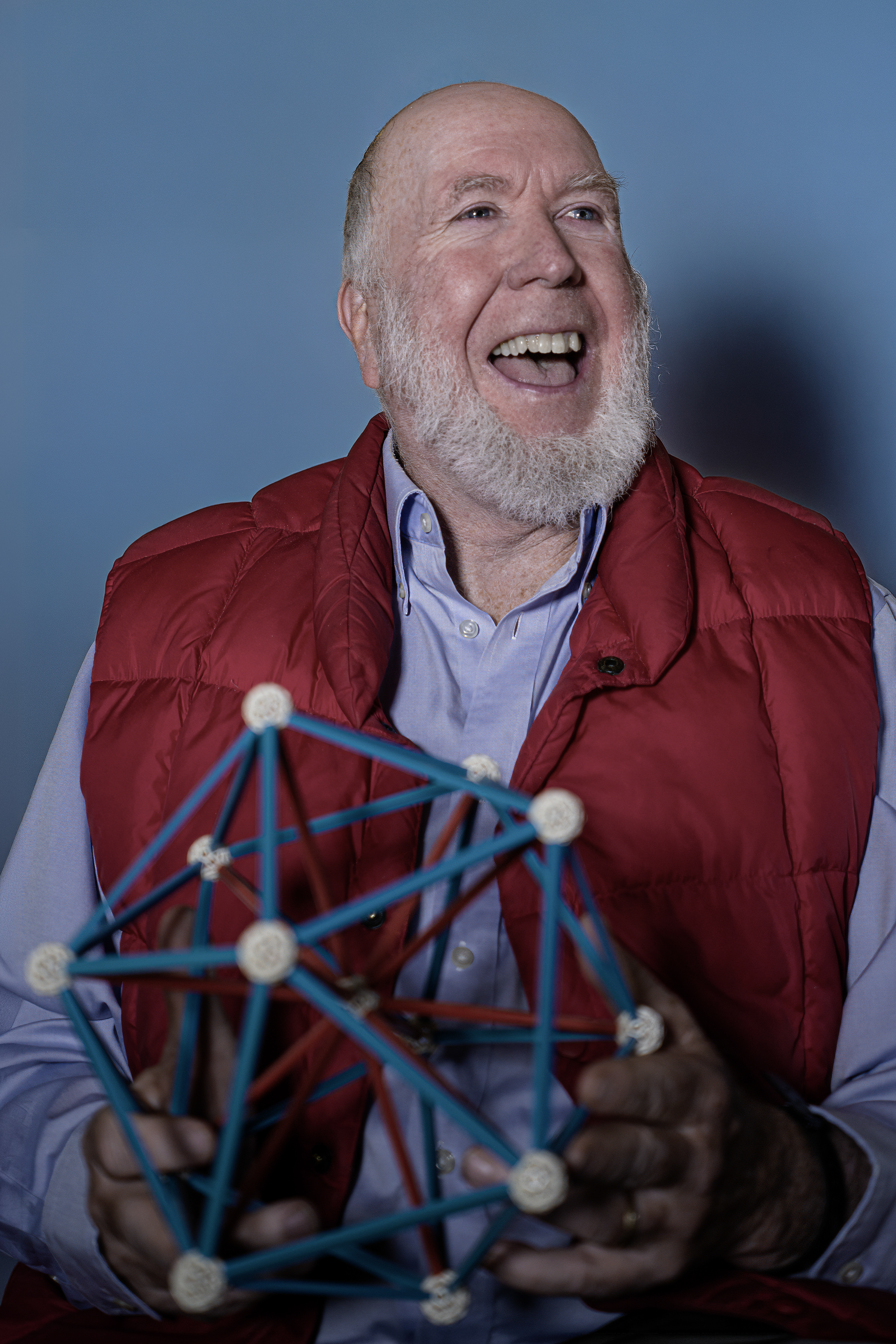
- Kelly in 2022
- Born: 1952 (age 73–74); Pennsylvania, U.S.
- Occupations: Editor, publisher, writer, photographer

Kevin Kelly (born 1952) is the founding executive editor of Wired magazine and a former editor and publisher of the Whole Earth Review. He has also been a writer, photographer, conservationist, and student of Asian and digital culture.

== Life ==
Kelly was born in Pennsylvania, United States, in 1952, and graduated from Westfield High School, Westfield, New Jersey, in 1970. Through his father, an executive for Time who used systems analysis in his work, Kelly developed an early interest in cybernetics. He attended the University of Rhode Island for one year, studying geology.

Kelly has traveled extensively, backpacking in Asia. While travelling in the Middle East, he had a conversion experience and became a born-again Christian. He was raised Catholic.

He lives in Pacifica, California, a small coastal town just south of San Francisco. He is married to the biochemist Gia-Miin Fuh and has three children: Kaileen, Ting, and Tywen.

Among Kelly's personal involvements is a campaign to make a full inventory of all living species on earth, an effort also known as the Linnaean enterprise. He is also sequencing his genome and co-organizes the Bay Area Quantified Self Meetup Group.

== Career ==
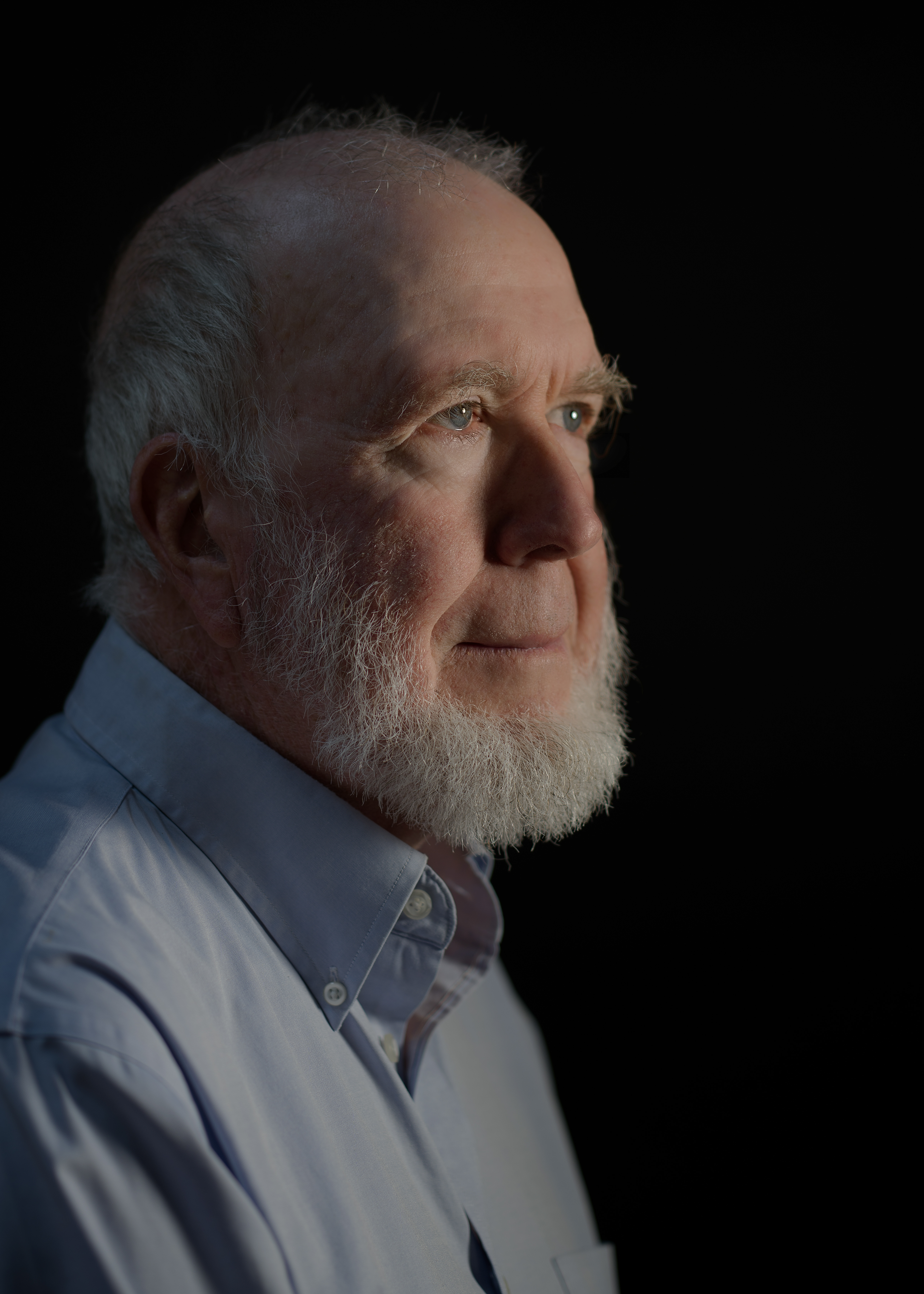
Kelly in 2022

Kelly began contributing freelance articles to CoEvolution Quarterly in 1980, while living in Athens, Georgia. Around this time, he was also editing his own start-up magazine called Walking Journal, and working in an epidemiology laboratory to support himself.

He was hired in 1983 by Whole Earth founder Stewart Brand to edit some of the later editions of the Whole Earth Catalog, the Whole Earth Review, and Signal. With Brand, Kelly helped found the WELL, an influential virtual community. As director of the Point Foundation, he co-sponsored the first Hackers Conference in 1984.

In 1992, Kelly was hired by Louis Rossetto to serve as executive editor of Wired, which was launched in March 1993. He brought to the magazine the cybernetic social vision of the Whole Earth publications and their networked style of editorial work, while also recruiting writers and editors from the WELL. He stepped down as executive editor in 1999; his current job title at Wired is Senior Maverick. Partially due to his reputation as Wired's editor, he is noted as a participant in and an observer of cyberculture.

Kelly's writing has appeared in many other national and international publications such as The New York Times, The Economist, Time, Harper's Magazine, Science, Veneer Magazine, GQ, and Esquire. His photographs have appeared in Life and other American national magazines.

As well as serving as editor on many publications, Kelly has written many novels surrounding his interest in cybernetics and all things tech. He is known for coining the term "The Technium," the accumulation of all technologies and inventions as a working, living system. Much of his work revolves around technology as a "living organism." He even refers to "The Technium" as the seventh kingdom of nature, that is self-organizing and autonomous. Kelly's book-length publication, Out of Control: The New Biology of Machines, Social Systems, and the Economic World (1992), presents a view on the mechanisms of complex organization. The central theme of the book is that several fields of contemporary science and philosophy point in the same direction: intelligence is not organized in a centralized structure but much more like a bee-hive of small simple components. Kelly applies this view to bureaucratic organisations, intelligent computers, and to the human brain.

He helped found the All Species Foundation. He was a futurist adviser on the Steven Spielberg-directed movie Minority Report.

Kelly has a chapter giving advice in Tim Ferriss's book Tools of Titans.

== Select works ==
=== Books ===
- Out of Control: The New Biology of Machines, Social Systems and the Economic World (Basic Books, 1992; Fourth Estate, 1995)
- New Rules for the New Economy: 10 Radical Strategies for a Connected World (Penguin, 1999)
- "Photographers section: Kevin Kelly," pp. 106–111, in Lloyd Kahn, editor 2004 Home Work (Shelter Publications, 2004)
- True Films (2006)
- "Forward: 1000 True Fans," pp. 3–8, in Be The Media, David Mathison, editor, (2009)
- What Technology Wants (2010)
- Cool Tools (2013) – Tool reviews collected from his weblog of the same name in large scale format similar to Whole Earth Catalog
- The Inevitable (2016)
- Vanishing Asia: Three Volume Set: West, Central and East. Photographs, text and design by Kevin Kelly (1084 pages) (2021)
- Excellent Advice for Living: Wisdom I Wish I'd Known Earlier (2023)

=== Photography and art ===
- Asia Grace (2002)
- Bad Dreams (2003)
- Bicycle Haiku (1995)

=== Lectures ===
- Speculations on the Future of Science by Kevin Kelly. Lecture to Long Now Foundation, at Fort Mason in San Francisco. March 10, 2006.
- The Next Fifty Years of Science by Kevin Kelly. Google TechTalk, May 9, 2006. (47 minutes)
- How Technology Evolves by Kevin Kelly Talk at the TED Conference in Monterey, CA, February 2005. (21 minutes)
- The next 5000 days of the Web by Kevin Kelly Talk at the EG 2007 Conference in Monterey, CA, December 2007.
- Technium Unbound by Kevin Kelly SALT Talk for The Long Now Foundation. November 12, 2014.
- Cool Tools at XOXO by Kevin Kelly Talk at XOXO Festival 2014, Portland, OR.

== Works cited ==
- Turner, Fred (2006). From counterculture to cyberculture: Stewart Brand, the Whole Earth Network, and the rise of digital utopianism. Chicago: University of Chicago Press.
