= Katie Drummond =

Canadian-American journalist

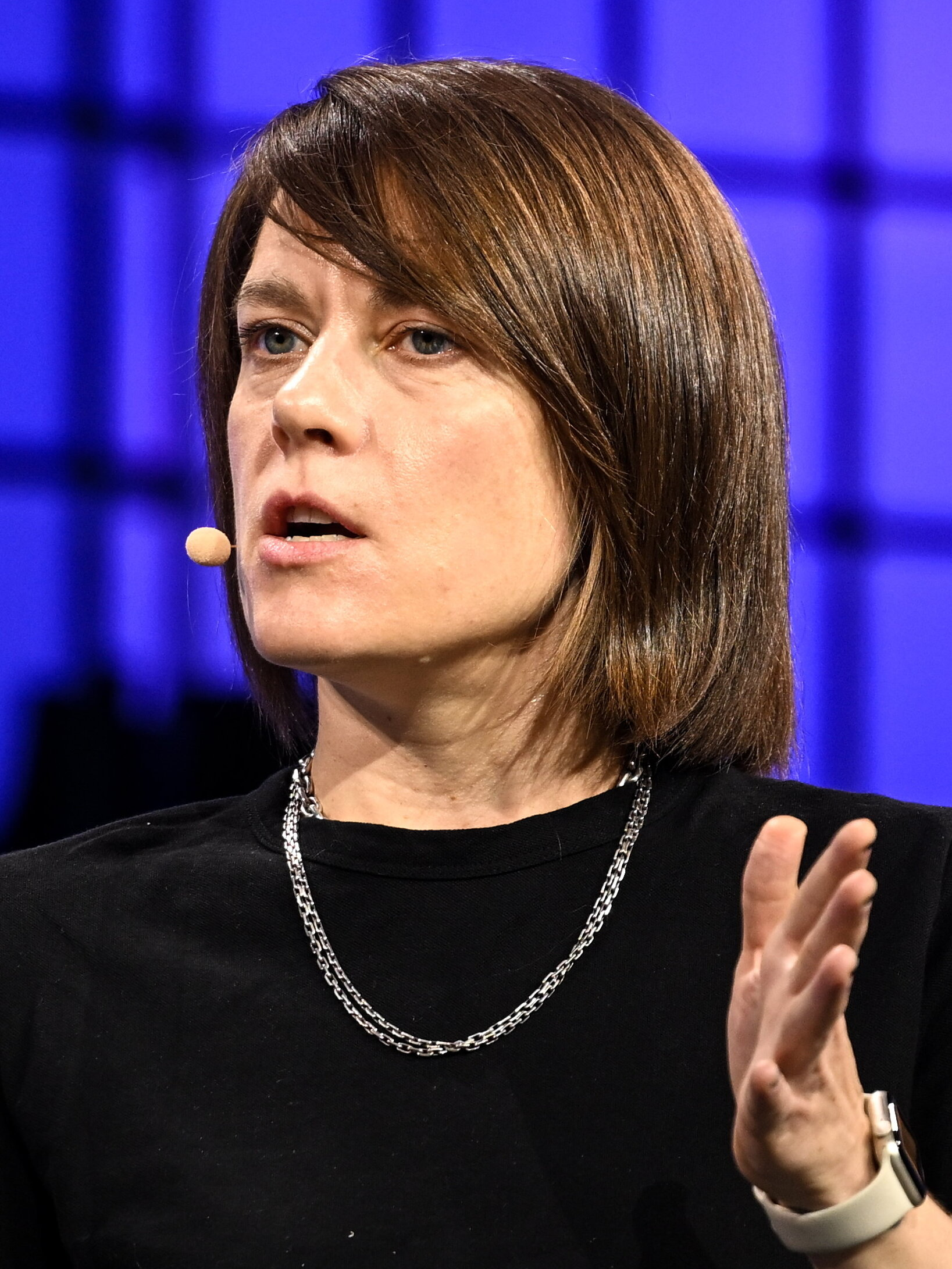
- Drummond in 2025
- Born: 1985/1986 (age 40–41); Calgary, Alberta, Canada
- Education: Queen's University at Kingston (BA)
- Occupation: Journalist
- Employer: Wired

Katie Drummond (born 1985 or 1986) is a Canadian-American journalist and the current global editorial director at Wired. She has also worked at Vice Media, Gizmodo, and Bloomberg.

== Early life and education ==
Drummond was born and raised in Calgary. She attended Queen's University, where she obtained a bachelor's degree in philosophy in 2008. Drummond decided to pursue writing when she was 18 after the death of her mother.

== Career ==
After graduating from college, Drummond moved to New York. In 2009, she joined Wired as an intern, covering military research for the magazine's national security blog. In 2013, Drummond was hired by The Verge to run its new science section. She became assistant managing editor in April 2014. In November 2014, Drummond became a deputy editor at Bloomberg Businessweek. The Verge founder Josh Topolsky had also departed for Bloomberg earlier that year. A year later, Drummond was hired as editor-in-chief at Gizmodo. After serving as executive managing editor for five months, Drummond left Gizmodo in April 2017 to become the first executive editor at The Outline, which Topolsky had founded the year before. After leaving The Outline, Drummond worked for almost a year at Medium before she became a vice president at Vice Media in 2019, focusing on digital content.

=== Wired ===
On August 10, 2023, Condé Nast announced that Drummond would return to Wired as global editorial editor, replacing Gideon Lichfield, who had served in the role since March 2021. Under Drummond's leadership Wired increasingly began focusing on political coverage, establishing a politics team. The magazine has covered Elon Musk and the Department of Government Efficiency as well as the 2026 Iran War and the rise of artificial intelligence.

== Personal life ==
As of 2023, Drummond is married and has a daughter. She and her family live in Brooklyn, New York City.
