= Quartz (publication) =

American business news organization

- Available in: English
- Owner: Redbrick
- Key people: Jay Lauf; Zach Seward; Kate Weber
- Revenue: ▼$26.9 million (2019)
- Net income: -$18.4 million (2019)
- Website: qz.com
- Commercial: Yes
- Launched: September 24, 2012; 14 years ago

Quartz is an American English language news website owned by Redbrick, a Canadian software firm.

Focused on international business news, it was founded in 2012 by Atlantic Media in New York City as a "digitally native news outlet for business people in the new global economy".

== History ==
On September 24, 2012, Quartz launched its website, designed to deliver content primarily to mobile and tablet users. Its founding team members were from news organizations including Bloomberg, The Economist, The New York Times, and The Wall Street Journal.

The publication was initially led by Kevin Delaney, a former managing director of WSJ.com, Zach Seward, a former WSJ social media editor, and Gideon Lichfield, a global news editor from The Economist, among other editors.

With its main office in New York, it also had correspondents and staff reporters based in Hong Kong, India, London, Los Angeles, Thailand, Washington DC, and elsewhere. According to its website at the time, Quartz's team reported in 115 countries and spoke 19 languages.

In 2015, a year after expanding into India and launching Quartz India, it launched the Africa-focused Quartz Africa and the chart-building platform Atlas. Meanwhile, it launched publications specifically for Hong Kong, Japan, and the United Arab Emirates. According to Ad Age, Quartz made around $30 million in revenue in 2016, and employed 175 people.

With its website registering approximately 22 million unique users in August, Quartz saw its revenue decrease to $27.6 million as advertising spending declined. Approximately 700,000 people subscribed to its roster of email newsletters, including its flagship Daily Brief.

In 2018, Japanese company Uzabase (Japanese: ユーザベース) acquired Quartz from Atlantic Media for $86 million. In October 2019, when Seward became the site's new CEO after then co-CEO and editor-in-chief Delaney resigned, Quartz had its app removed by Apple from its Chinese App Store, as part of the Great Firewall, for reporting on the 2019–20 Hong Kong protests.

Quartz implemented a paywall from 2019 to 2022.

Revenue fell from $11.6 million in the first half of 2019 to $5 million in the first half of 2020. After being sold by Uzabase to the publication's staff in November 2020, the site was acquired by G/O Media in April 2022.

In January 2025, a year after Quartz India was shut down, the site drew controversy for publishing content written by artificial intelligence. A G/O Media spokesperson called their AI reporting tools "purely experimental."

In April 2025, G/O Media sold Quartz and sister site The Inventory to Redbrick, a Canadian software firm. Ten out of twelve Quartz newsroom employees were then let go.

== Content ==
During its early years, Quartz was structured around a collection of phenomena or what it calls "obsessions" instead of "beats", preferring news stories or reports to be either short or long rather than the "typical 800-word story".

In 2015, Quartz created an open-source Chartbuilder tool to make charts. Chartbuilder was used by other media organizations, including CNBC, FiveThirtyEight, NBC News, New Hampshire Public Radio, NPR, The New Yorker, The Press-Enterprise, and The Wall Street Journal.

In December 2024, a ChatGPT tool used to write hundreds of daily articles on securities and exchange filings for the past year was shut down because it sometimes published incorrect names and figures that belonged to other companies. As of January 2025 Quartz had expanded its use of generative AI to publish lengthier articles with disclaimers about potential inaccuracies due to the use of experimental technology. These articles summarize other sources, which are often mangled or misrepresented, and in some cases are themselves AI-generated.

In October 2026, Press Gazette reported that since March 2026 nearly all Quartz articles have the byline of a single Filipino digital marketer and are suspected to be AI-generated.

== See also ==
- Quartz News (Facebook Watch)
