= Gideon Lichfield =

British journalist

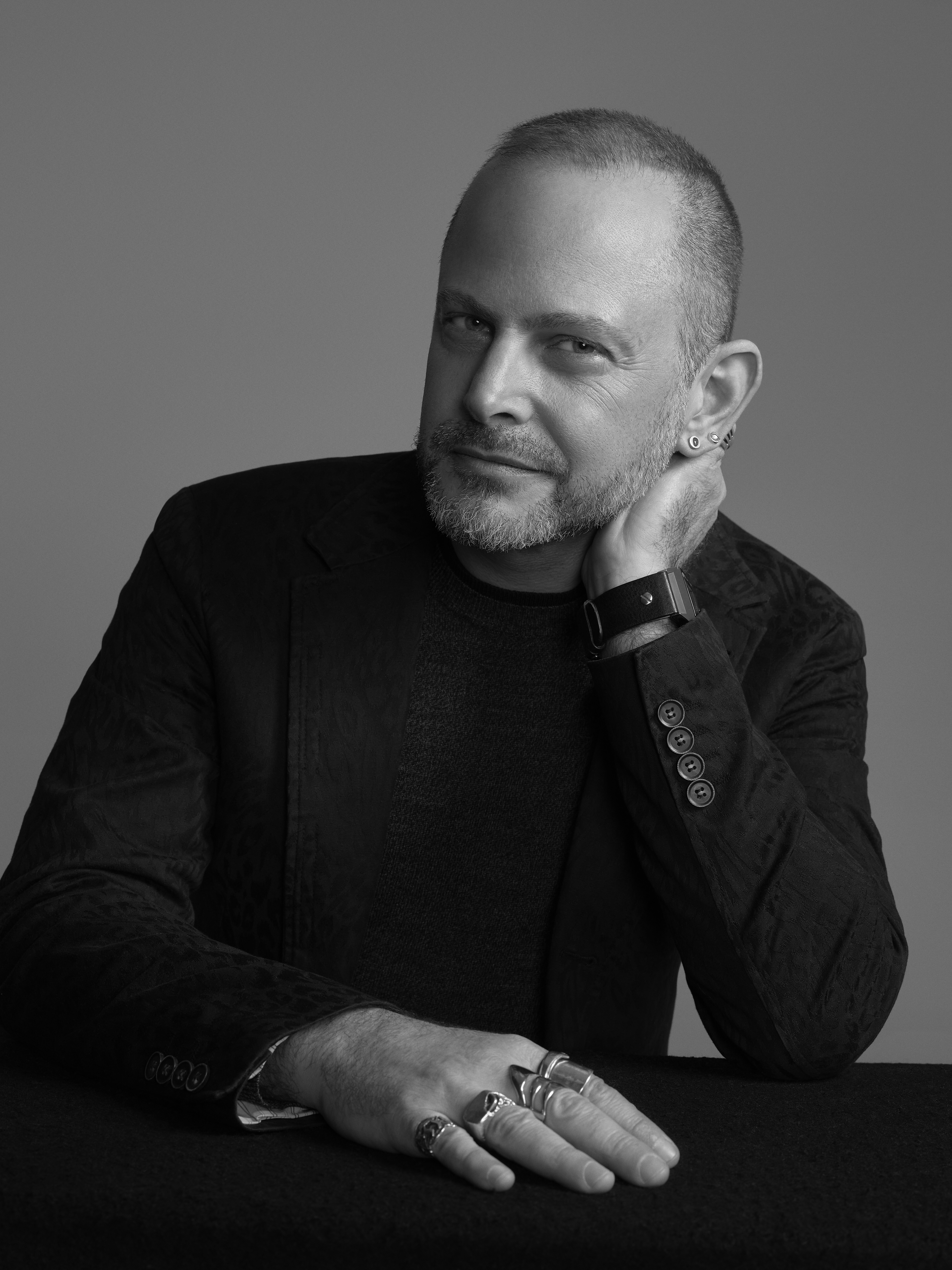
Gideon Lichfield portrait

Gideon Lichfield (born 4, August, 1971) is a British journalist who served as global editorial director and editor-in-chief of Wired magazine from March 2021 until August 2023 and before that as editor-in-chief of MIT Technology Review.

== Career ==
Lichfield began his journalism career in 1996 at The Economist, where he started on the science desk before becoming the title's correspondent in Mexico City, Moscow and Jerusalem. He then moved to New York City and held various roles, including editorial head of Economist Education, an internal startup aimed at business executives.

Lichfield had a one-year fellowship at the Data & Society Research Institute, where he wrote science fiction pieces exploring the social and political implications of technological advances. He also served as an adjunct professor at New York University, teaching a graduate course in foreign reporting at the Arthur L. Carter Journalism Institute.

Lichfield was one of the founding editors at Quartz. Hired at the company's inception in 2012, he led the newsroom, developed the ethics policy and style guide, and edited the Quartz Daily Brief newsletter.

In December 2017, Lichfield moved to MIT Technology Review as editor-in-chief, overseeing the publication's editorial content and products, including the website, digital newsletters, print magazine and live events, as well as new platforms and formats under development. While at MIT he edited Make Shift: Dispatches from the Post-Pandemic Future, a speculative-fiction anthology published in May 2021 by MIT Press, with stories from writers including Madeline Ashby, Indrapramit Das, Ken Liu, Malka Older, and Cory Doctorow.

On March 22, 2021, Lichfield was appointed the global editorial director at Wired and editor-in-chief of Wired US. As global editorial director, Lichfield set the overall content strategy, vision and tone across all of Wired's platforms in the markets where the company owned and operated the title. Lichfield was the sixth editor-in-chief of Wired US, and the first global editorial director. Under his leadership the title launched a Spanish-language edition, Wired en Español, adding to its existing editions in the US, UK, Italy and Japan.

Lichfield announced in June 2023 he was stepping down as Wired's editor-in-chief by September, or earlier if a replacement were to be found. He was replaced by Katie Drummond on August 28, 2023.

== Works ==
- Lichfield, Gideon (2021): Make Shift: Dispatches from the Post-Pandemic Future. ISBN 978-0-2625-4240-1
