= Hack Canada =

Hack Canada is a Canadian organization run by hackers and phreakers that provides information mainly about telephones, computer technology, and legal issues related to technology.

Founded in 1998 by CYBØRG/ASM, HackCanada has been in media publications many times, including Wired News and the Edmonton Sun newspaper (as well as other regional newspapers) for developments such as A Palm Pilot red boxing program. Hackcanada has also been featured in books such as Hacking for Dummies (ISBN 076455784X) and Steal This Computer Book. Hackcanada was also featured often on the Hacker News Network.

On November 29, 2017, almost twenty years after its registration, the HackCanada.com domain went offline and now displays a "This Domain Name Has Expired" message. This has since been replaced with a domain parking site that offers the domain for purchase on GoDaddy.com.
