= SAE Expression College =

Defunct for-profit digital arts college in California

Coordinates: 37°50′50.83″N 122°17′42.17″W

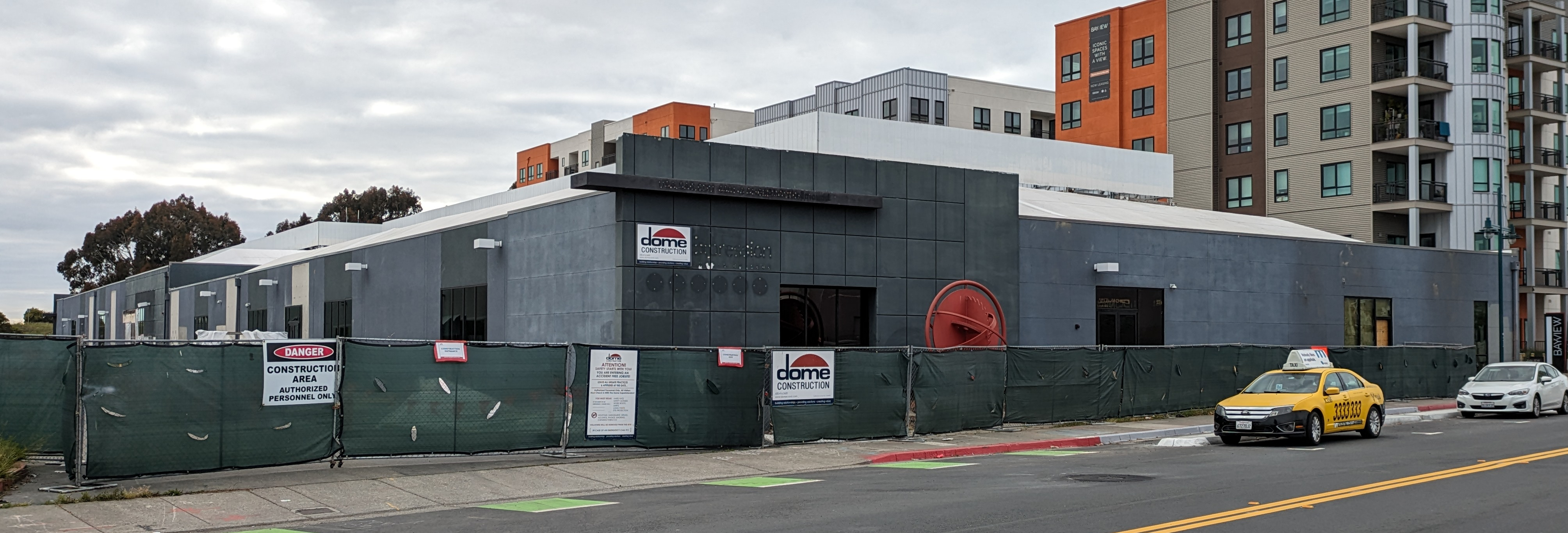
- Former location, pictured in 2024
- Former names: Ex'pression Center for New Media (1998–2004); Ex'pression College for Digital Arts (2004–2012); Ex'pression College (2012–2016)
- Motto: Make Your Passion Your Profession
- Type: for-profit college
- Active: 1998– 2022; 4 years ago
- Location: Emeryville and San Jose, California, United States
- Website: "SAE Expression College". SAE Institute. Archived from the original on November 7, 2018.

SAE Expression College was a private for-profit college in Emeryville, California. It offered an around-the-clock schedule and eight week terms. It awarded Bachelor's degrees after 36 months (two and a half years) of accelerated education.

== History ==
Ex'pression Center for New Media logo, 2000

Expression College for Digital Arts logo, 2012

=== 1998–1999: Early beginnings ===
SAE Expression College, originally known as Ex'pression College, was founded by Gary Platt, a sound recording engineer and educator, and Eckart Wintzen, a Dutch venture capitalist and media arts enthusiast. A 65,000-square-foot (6,000 m^{2}) building was acquired in Emeryville, California to house a new school to be called Ex'pression Center for New Media. SAE Expression hired Walters-Storyk Design Group to help design the facility which housed the school. Building began in November 1998.

On September 9, 1998, SAE Expression College received temporary approval from the California Bureau for Private Postsecondary and Vocational Education (BPPVE) to operate, and to offer course instruction in digital visual media and sound comprehensive programs. The BPPVE granted SAE Expression College temporary approvals to operate and offer diploma, associates and bachelor's degree programs in September 1998. In January 2001, SAE Expression College was granted approval to operate, and renewed the approval to operate in October 2005.

On January 11, 1999, 60 students began classes in Sound Arts and Digital Visual Media, the first two programs offered by the school.

=== 2004–2007: Expansion, accreditation, and name change ===
In 2004, the school had more than 500 students enrolled. The same year, its name was changed from Ex'pression Center for New Media to Ex'pression College for Digital Arts. The change reflects a stronger emphasis on bachelor's degree level learning and more accurately describes the core focus of the college's curriculum in digital arts.

In April 2005, the school became an accredited college with the Accrediting Commission of Career Schools and Colleges of Technology (ACCSCT). In August that same year, Ex'pression College was formally recognized by the U.S. Department of Education and approved to participate in the Title IV Federal Student Aid programs such as Stafford Loan, Pell Grant, and PLUS Loan.

In November 2006, Ex'pression College was approved by the State of California's Bureau for Private Postsecondary and Vocational Education to offer its fourth BAS degree in Game Art & Design and received approval to offer the Game Art & Design BAS program from the ACCSCT In December of that year.

In early 2007, Ex'pression College expanded its facilities adding 13,000 square feet (1,200 m^{2}), creating several new classrooms.

=== 2008–2012: Death of co-founder and opening of new campus ===
In 2008, after the death of co-founder Eckart Wintzen, his daughter Clien Wintzen succeeded him as the head of Ex'pression.

In 2012, Ex'pression College opened a branch campus in San Jose, California. The San Jose campus could accommodate 550 students and have a staff of 120 employees.

=== 2012–2016: Struggles, Navitas Group acquisition, and name change ===
In 2012, Ex'pression College was deemed ineligible as a participating Cal Grant school due to the college's high student loan default rate.

In 2014, Ex'pression College was deemed re-eligible for Cal Grant. and announced its San Jose campus to be approved to participate in Cal Grant 2014-2015 as well.

In summer 2014, Clien Wintzen sold Ex'pression to SAE Institute. SAE's parent company, Navitas, instated new administrators, who quickly began demoting teachers. Numerous longtime employees resigned.

On July 1, 2016, Ex'pression College in Emeryville became recognized as SAE Expression College, while Ex'pression College in San Jose became SAE Institute San Jose.

=== 2017–2023: Closures ===
In 2017, the SAE Institute campus in San Jose was permanently closed due to lack of enrollment and financial issues.

In 2021, SAE Expression College stopped accepting new enrollments. Their website directed users to explore creative media programs at one of the other SAE Institute locations.

On January 10, 2022, it was announced that the Emeryville campus previously leased to SAE Expression College had been sold to Longfellow Real Estate Partners by Griffin Capital for $36 million. No public announcement was made about the future of the college.

In December 2022, former Expression employees and students posted on social media regarding the final closure of SAE Expression College.

By 2023, SAE removed the Expression College page from their website entirely.

== Academics ==
The college offered the Bachelor of Applied Science degree. It operated 24 hours a day, 7 days a week, with students in class or lab for 4 hours at a time; lectures generally taking place between the hours of 9:00am and 9:00pm, and labs running throughout the day. Many classes had a three-hour lecture, a one-hour break, and then a four-hour lab.

SAE Expression College offered bi-monthly start dates for new enrollees. Throughout the course of a program, the average SAE Expression College student had two courses at one time, with one course occurring on three days a week and the other course occurring on two or three depending on the class. This course load sometimes fluctuated, however, according to the student's program and month.

Courses were eight weeks long up until 2017, and new courses used to start every eight weeks. This schedule allowed SAE Expression College a fluid, if intense, operating method. If a student failed a class, they were allowed to take it again with no charge, one time. Further class retakes were not covered, and had to be paid for by the students.

By May 2017, the term duration had changed to 15 weeks long, and students had to take 4-5 classes for each term.

== Student life ==
Student life, like the school itself, was different from a typical college. Since the curriculum was accelerated, with new courses at one time beginning every 5 weeks, and later every 8 weeks, classmates who started at the same time frequently stayed together throughout the program (and sometimes assigned a name to their group). This was seen as a benefit, as one of the school's focuses was putting out small teams of graduates who knew each other and had worked together, so that they could get group internships. Class sizes were kept small, usually limited to 36 students.

There were several groups and clubs within the different degree programs of the school, each oriented toward student interests. Students in the relevant degree program generally managed the groups, with an instructor providing support.

SAE Expression College did not have on-campus student housing, but worked with Collegiate Housing Services to offer housing for students. CHS offered a shared housing program for new and ongoing students. CHS also helped students find alternative housing through their referral program. Most students lived within 5 miles (8.0 km) of the school in apartment complexes in the immediate area, often with roommates.

== Student earnings statistics ==
Students who graduated from the sound arts program at SAE Expression College on average made $24,000 before taxes and owed $5,500 a year in loan payments.

== Tuition ==
In 2014, SAE Expression College's tuition was set at $94,400 for a full four academic year Bachelor of Applied Science degree. According to their own net price calculator the full price of tuition could have varied from $96,096 to more than $130,000 depending on factors such as living situation and yearly household income. SAE Expression College's tuition was all-inclusive, including all books, whether they were real or electronic, and course materials. If the tuition was not paid in full at the time of enrollment, then the student is subject to a periodic tuition increase.

== Graduation rate ==
Less than half of all students who enrolled at SAE Expression College graduated. The official number given by the California Student Aid Commission was 49.5 percent.

== Accreditation ==
SAE Expression College was accredited by the Accrediting Commission of Career Schools and Colleges of Technology (ACCSC), which is a national accreditor of primarily vocational schools and career schools within the United States.

== Notable faculty and alumni ==
=== Faculty ===
- Scott Mathews, former advisory board member.
- Jack Douglas, former instructor of "Studio Etiquette" course.
- Spencer Nilsen, former president of Ex'pression College.
- Doug Siebum, former instructor in Sound Arts, Digital Film, Entertainment Business.

=== Alumni ===
- Alex Henning won an Oscar in 2012 for his Visual Effects work on Martin Scorsese's 3D film Hugo.
- Tommy Orange, novelist
- Alon Zaslavsky is a technical director and visual effects artist who was part of the Emmy award-winning visual-effects team for Game of Thrones. His credits also include Moana, Miss Peregrine's Home for Peculiar Children, Alpha, and Wonder Woman.
