= Cat boarding =

Care for a cat during the owner's absence

Cat boarding refers to overnight boarding of cats during the absence of the owner for example during a holiday or business trip, under the care of trained and experienced staff. It can be offered in a designated, professional boarding facilities, but also in private cat sitters' homes, or the homes of cat owners. Similar to dog boarding facilities, cat boarding facilities are specifically designed to meet the needs of cats, so that they are safe and comfortable during their owners' absence.

== Background ==
The practice of cat boarding has evolved as a solution for housing cats when their owners are away. Cat boarding ranges from traditional sitters to modern cat hotels offering a wide range of entertainment and housing options. Some also use home cat boarding services or look for local cat sitters in their area.

The concept of cat boarding emerged in the early 2000s and since then the industry has been growing steadily. Before World War II, cats in the United States predominantly lived outdoors, but urbanization led to increased indoor living for cats. In places where cats were introduced by humans, for example in New Zealand, cats can pose significant danger to the native wildlife, especially small birds, lizards and rodents. In these countries there are growing calls to reduce the number of free-roaming an feral cats. In 2022, the global market for pet boarding services was valued at US$6.72 billion and is forecast to continue to grow at a strong compound annual growth rate of 8.30% between 2023 and 2030. This expansion is primarily driven by factors such as the growing popularity of pet boarding services, the rise in pet ownership, the trend towards the humanization of pets, and the increasing spending on pet care in both developed and developing countries.

== Types ==
=== Professional cat boarding ===
A professional cat boarding facility is a type of cattery, and is a purpose-built facility usually equipped with air conditioning and heating and is staffed by professionally trained staff. The number of professional cat boarding facilities has grown since the end of the COVID 19 pandemic. Professional cat boarding facilities typically offer a range of amenities, with a variety of equipment and toys to keep guests comfortable and occupied.

==== Communal cat boarding ====
These are usually the cheapest form of cat boarding, which is often just a room or series of rooms where the cats all mingle together, are fed together and sleep in whatever space they can find. These cat boarding can be overcrowded, especially at peak times, and they also have the highest number of fights. Carers cannot monitor cats' eating, and communal toileting, eating and drinking can lead to outbreaks of illness if unchecked, which can be hard to contain. Cats in communal cat boarding benefit from the much greater space available for roaming and playing. In England, cats cannot be boarded in a unit with cats from another household, and communal exercise areas are not allowed.

==== Semi-communal cat boarding ====
With individual cages and large play areas, semi-communal cat boarding is the middle ground between communal and celled cat boarding. Here, cats are fed in cages and separated at night from others, and there is the monitoring of toileting. Specific diets can be catered for, and medications can be given. The play areas of semi-communal cat boarding can have meshed open-air areas which along with separate animal feeding helps to greatly reduce the transmission of illness.

==== Celled cat boarding ====
Often purpose-build, these establishments provide a private, separate area for each cat. Similar to an aviary, they are meshed rooms within a much large facility. Ventilation is ample, which greatly reduces the transmission of illnesses. Similarly to semi-communal cat boarding, cats can be fed specialized diets and medication, and their toileting can be monitored. There is no chance of cats intermingling, and the chance of overcrowding is greatly reduced too. Celled cat boarding is at the high end of the pricing spectrum.

=== Private cat boarding ===
Home cat boarding is overnight cat care provided by a cat sitter in the privacy of their own home. This boarding service is popular with anxious but strictly social cats, and it typically works with a small, recurring clientele.

=== In-home boarding ===
In-home boarding is a form of overnight cat care that takes place in the cat owner's home. Many cat owners prefer to leave their cats in their own home, in their familiar surroundings, with a known and trusted person looking after them. This is a commonly used service for, for example, non-social or aggressive cats.
