= Jane Metcalfe =

American businesswoman

- Metcalfe in 2021
- Born: November 15, 1961 (age 64); Louisville, Kentucky, U.S.
- Education: University of Colorado Boulder (B.A., International Affairs); Louisville Collegiate School
- Known for: co-founder of Wired, coined the phrase "neobiological revolution"

Jane Metcalfe (born November 15, 1961, in Louisville, Kentucky) is an American businesswoman, entrepreneur, author and publisher. She currently serves as the executive board chair of the Human Immunome Project and is the founder and CEO of proto.life (fka NEO.LIFE). Metcalfe is a co-founder and former president of Wired Ventures, creator and original publisher of the magazine Wired, and former President of TCHO Chocolate.

== Early life and education ==
Jane Metcalfe was born on November 15, 1961, in Louisville, Kentucky. After mother was diagnosed as mentally ill and institutionalized when Jane was three, Jane grew up in a single-parent home. After high school, she attended the University of Colorado Boulder, graduating with a Bachelor of Arts degree in International Affairs. She then moved abroad, living in the Netherlands, France, and Switzerland. In Europe she met Louis Rossetto. The two worked together for a time in Holland for a high-tech trade publication, and became life partners.

== Career and entrepreneurship ==
In the 1990s, Metcalfe and Rossetto moved back to the United States, where they co-founded Wired Ventures, Inc. Metcalfe is a former president of the business, which eventually included Wired (U.S., UK, and Japanese editions), a suite of internet sites (including HotBot and WebMonkey), a book imprint, and a cable show with MSNBC. Wired Ventures published Wired magazine from 1993 to 1998. Wired Ventures also launched HotWired in 1994, one of the first web-based publications with original content, which was one of the first uses of advertising on the web. Wired magazine covered how digital technology affects culture and daily life and became influential in shaping discourse around the internet revolution. The magazine received numerous awards for journalism, general excellence, and design. Wired worked with the Roski School of Art and Design at the University of Southern California to create an innovative curriculum combining computer science, business, film, and design.

In 2010, Wired was called the magazine of the decade by AdAge. In 2013, Metcalfe and Rossetto were the inaugural recipients of the Lanny Friedlander Prize from the Reason Foundation for having "created a publication, medium, or distribution platform that vastly expands human freedom by increasing our ability to express ourselves, engage in debate, and generate new ways of understanding." In 2015 Metcalfe and Rossetto won a Webby Award Lifetime Achievement Award for their contributions.

In 2009, Metcalfe became President of TCHO Chocolate, an American chocolate brand founded in 2005 by Karl Bittong and Timothy Childs. The TCHOSource program was known for its sourcing and programs to transfer technology and expertise to cacao farmers. In early 2018, TCHO was sold to the Japanese firm Ezaki Glico (maker of Pocky).

In 2017, Metcalfe founded the media company NEO.LIFE to focus on the intersections between biology, technology, and humanity that Metcalfe refers to as a "neobiological revolution". (Metcalfe's NEO.LIFE is distinct from the NEOLIFE nutrition company, founded in 1958 by Jerry Brassfield.) In 2019, Metcalfe and Brian Bergstein co-edited the book, NEO.LIFE: 25 Visions for the Future of Our Species, featuring scientists, investors, artists, and science fiction writers. The media company NEO.LIFE was rebranded as proto.life in early 2023, and ceased operation in 2024.

In 2025, Metcalfe became executive board chair of the Human Immunome Project, a global nonprofit organization aimed at mapping the human immune system. She also serves on the Board of Directors of Annual Reviews. Metcalfe has also been involved with co-chairing the Council of the Focused Ultrasound Foundation, the Long Now Foundation as a Council Member, the UC Berkeley Foundation, UC Berkeley Art Museum and Pacific Film Archive, Prix Ars Electronica, ZER01: The Art and Technology Network, One Economy, Expression Center for New Media, and Electronic Frontier Foundation.

She is a frequent public speaker and has spoken at Ignite (on HIP), UC Berkeley, MIT, Stanford, AI for Good, Imagination in Action, Singularity University, ComicCon, De Young Museum, StartUp Health, Health 2.0, Wired Health, TEDx San Francisco, TEDx Carnegie Mellon, Exponential Medicine, Idea City, The Long Now Foundation, among others. She advises and moderates events for the Lake Nona Impact Forum, SynBioBeta, CNSSummit, BrainMind, and has run panels for Singularity University, SFMOMA, the De Young Museum, and many others.
