= Pet-friendly dormitories =

Pet-friendly housing options in US colleges

Pet-friendly residence halls have appeared as a number of colleges and universities in the United States. In 2008, USA Today estimated that at least 12 colleges and universities allows some form of pet-friendly living arrangements. Students at other institutions have advocated for pet-friendly housing policies.

== Survey ==
A Kaplan Test Prep survey from 2011 found that 38% of colleges and universities in the United States had student housing where pets were allowed. At these institutions, a certain portion of the school's residence halls are set aside for students who wish to live with a pet, often a dog or cat.

== US colleges ==
Massachusetts Institute of Technology and State University of New York at Canton allow cats in certain dormitories. Sweet Briar College allows equestrian students to bring their horses to campus. Case Western Reserve University allowed caged animals, such as rabbits or hamsters, and allows "mascot" dogs in the fraternity and sorority houses. Lehigh University also allows "mascot" dogs in the fraternity and sorority houses. Principia College permits pets that may be kept in a cage or tank. University of Notre Dame allows fish tanks.

At Eckerd College, a few residence halls are set aside as "pet dorms" for students wishing to bring small animals to campus. Other special residence halls include "Wellness Houses", that promote healthy living, and service-learning dormitories, for students interested in monthly community service projects. At Lees-McRae College, students are allowed to have pets in select on-campus residences. Before the academic year begins, the college hosts an open house for students with pets. Stetson University permits dogs in three on-campus residences. The campus also features a dog park.

Since 2006, Washington & Jefferson College has set aside Monroe Hall as the "Pet House." During the 2009–10 school year, 10 students lived in the Pet House; that number jumped to 34 in the 2010–11 school year. The college only permits "family pets" that have been owned by the student's family for more than one year. Stephens College has had a pet-friendly dormitory, called "Pet Central," since 1993. The college also has a program that allows students to foster rescue dogs in dorms.
