= Unavoidable (disambiguation) =

Unavoidable is an album by Daniel Lee Chee Hun.

Unavoidable may also refer to:

- "Unavoidable", a song by Dear Jane
- Unavoidable EP, by Killing Time

== See also ==
- Unavoidable Girl, a Vietnamese television series
- Unavoidable pattern, a formal pattern which occurs in all sufficiently long strings of symbols
