= Louis Rossetto =

American writer, editor, and entrepreneur

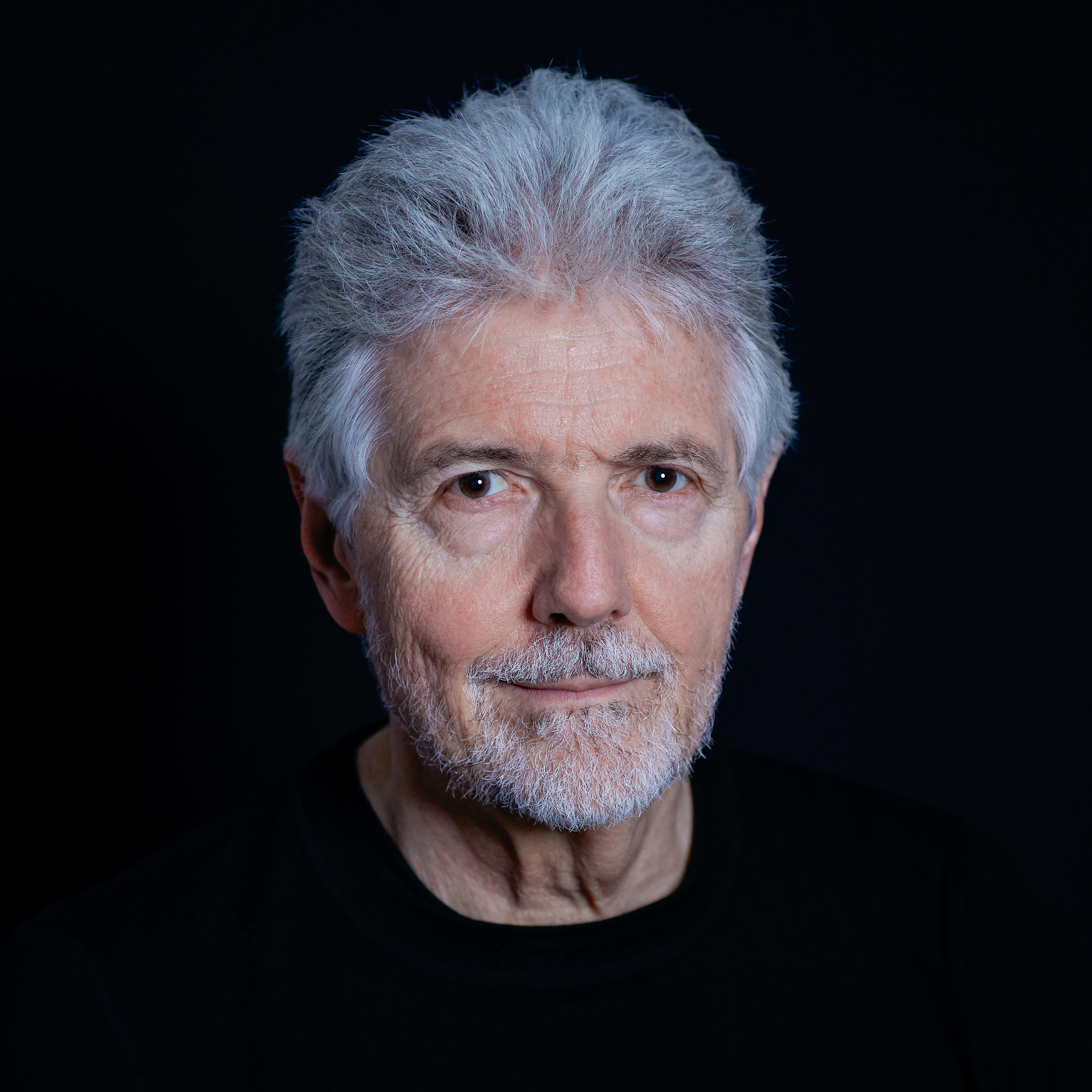
- Rossetto in May of 2017
- Born: Louis Rossetto Jr. 1949 (age 76–77); Great Neck, New York, U.S.
- Education: Columbia University
- Known for: Wired magazine, TCHO, Entrepreneurship
- Partner: Jane Metcalfe
- Children: 2

Louis Rossetto Jr. is an American writer, editor, and entrepreneur. He is best known as the founder and former editor-in-chief / publisher of Wired magazine. He was also the first investor and the former CEO of TCHO chocolate company.

== Personal life ==
Rossetto was raised in Great Neck, New York in an Italian-American family.

He went to Columbia University as an undergraduate, graduating in 1971, and later returned for an MBA, graduating in 1973.

Rossetto is life-partners with Jane Metcalfe and they have two children.

== Professional life ==
=== 1970s & 1980s ===
In 1971, while a senior in college, he appeared on the cover of the New York Times Sunday Magazine as co-author with Stan Lehr of "Libertarianism, The New Right Credo," one of the first articles about the emerging Libertarian movement. In 1974, he wrote a novel called Take-Over, released by controversial publisher Lyle Stuart. Take-Over posited a counterfactual history: instead of resigning during the Watergate crisis, Richard Nixon launched a coup d'état. In 1976, Rossetto ghost edited a new journalism book called Ultimate Porno about the making of Penthouse publisher Bob Guccione's film Caligula.

In 1985, he joined CBC reporter Richard Evans to report on the Afghanistan war for ABC News. Rossetto's subsequent articles for the Christian Science Monitor and newsweeklies Elseviers in the Netherlands and Panorama in Italy were among the first to pinpoint the war's turning point, when the mujahideen first put the Russians on the defensive that was ultimately to push them out of Afghanistan.

In 1986, Rossetto joined the staff of Amsterdam-based INK Taalservice, a high-tech translation company serving the new PC industry. INK launched an English-language magazine with Rossetto as editor called Language Technology, which covered the burgeoning the technologies used to process language — from PCs to machine translation to networks. The first issue of Language Technology was designed by leading edge Dutch graphic designer Max Kisman, and was the first issue of any magazine to be created with desktop publishing software, in this case ReadySetGo, which Rossetto had carried back from its introduction at that year's San Francisco MacWorld exhibition. During his time at Language Technology, Rossetto was a consultant to the European Community on language industry issues.

In 1986, Rossetto's life partner Jane Metcalfe joined as the magazine's ad sales director. INK later sold the magazine to a small Dutch media company Media Nederland, who renamed it Electric Word. Electric Word 's circulation grew to include leading research labs at universities, governments, and high tech companies around the world. Cover subjects were as diverse as computer visionary Alan Kay, AI pioneer Marvin Minsky, Timothy Leary, and MIT Media Lab founder Nicholas Negroponte. The magazine was later sold to a small Dutch media company and renamed Electric Word. ''Whole Earth Review editor Kevin Kelley proclaimed Electric Word "the least boring computer magazine in the world," which became its tagline.

At Media Nederland, Rossetto also became launch editor of its glossy, general interest monthly magazine O. When Electric Word was terminated in 1990 due to Media Nederland's change of focus, Rossetto left with Jane Metcalfe to write the business plan for Wired. The last issue of Electric Word featured the world's first Photoshopped magazine cover — of TED founder Richard Saul Wurman.

=== 1990s ===
In 1991, Rossetto and his partner Jane Metcalfe resettled in the US to raise capital for Wired. They launched the magazine on a shoestring budget in January 1993, with art director John Plunkett, executive editor Kevin Kelly, and managing editor John Battelle.

Wired was greatly admired for its bold design and its coverage of "digital culture". The magazine exuded a counterculture ethos—and was even compared to Rolling Stone as a barometer of the zeitgeist of the era. Its often deliberately provocative editorial reflected Rossetto's beliefs in a far-reaching "digital revolution" based on global consciousness and networked markets. Under Rossetto's five years as editor, the magazine won two National Magazine Awards for General Excellence and one National Magazine Award for Design.

In October 1994, Wired Ventures became an Internet pioneer when it launched the first Web site with original content and Fortune 500 advertising called HotWired. HotWired then proceeded to launch dozens of other Web sites, including Webmonkey and the search engine Hotbot. Hotwired employees Joey Anuff and Carl Steadman launched the first weblog Suck.com.

After HotWired, Wired expanded into books with HardWired and television with Wired TV. By 1996, it had Japanese and British editions, and was actively planning a German edition, as well as new business and design magazines.

Wired Venture's rapid expansion forced it in 1996 to turn to an IPO for financing. But after failing to take the company public as scheduled during what turned out to be a severe stock market downturn that summer, Rossetto and Metcalfe were forced to accept Providence Equity as financial partners in early 1997. By the summer of 1997, four years after launch, Wired magazine was solidly profitable. Its three-year-old online business, now renamed Wired Digital, was not. It was Wired Digital's cash needs which Providence used to wrest control of the company from Rossetto and Metcalfe in April 1997.

Despite Wired Ventures becoming cash-flow positive in May 1998, Providence sold off its assets. The company that Rossetto and Metcalfe began in 1991 with $30,000 was sold in pieces for $380 million. Condé Nast bought the now 500,000-circulation Wired magazine, and Lycos bought Wired Digital.

=== 2000s & 2010s ===
Since Wired, Rossetto has mostly avoided the public eye. He assisted with a 2001 redesign of Reason Magazine and defended the invasion of Iraq in its pages. He pursued disparate individual projects through his and Metcalfe's family holding company, Força da Imaginaçao. One was a large residential real estate project in Walnut Creek, California. Another was a 2006 investment in innovative, ultra-premium chocolate company, TCHO.

Rossetto was TCHO's CEO and CCO from 2007 to 2014. TCHO was known for its award-winning, flavor-focused chocolate and for pioneering TCHOSource program which transferred technology and expertise to partner growers in Peru, Ecuador, and Ghana.

In 2013, Rossetto and Metcalfe were honored by the Reason Foundation, a libertarian think tank, with the Lanny Friedlander Prize for having "created a publication, medium, or distribution platform that vastly expands human freedom by increasing our ability to express ourselves, engage in debate, and generate new ways of understanding."

In 2015, Rossetto and Metcalfe were honored with a Webby Lifetime Achievement Award. Their five word acceptance speech: "Remember, it's all just prelude."

In 2017, Rossetto published Change is Good, an original novel about "the creation myth of the Digital Generation — a week in the lives of five Gen Xers and one millennial at ground zero of the Internet Revolution in South of Market, San Francisco, as it mutates into the dotcom bubble." The book is designed by Erik Spiekermann, and published by Spiekermann's p98a in Berlin. It will be the first book published with Spiekerman's new letterpress printing process.
