= Greenwheels =

Carsharing corporation

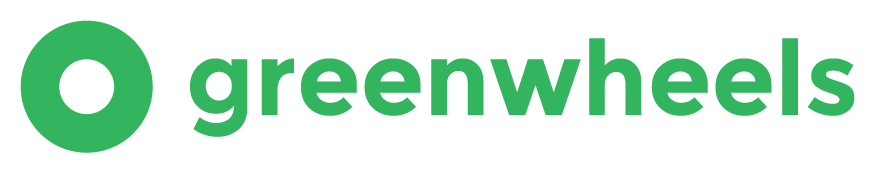
- Industry: Carsharing
- Founded: 1995
- Founder: Gijs van Lookeren Campagne and Jan Borghuis
- Headquarters: Rotterdam, Netherlands
- Area served: Netherlands (150+)
- Key people: Michiel Cuppen (CEO) Hans van Hoeij (CFO)
- Services: Carsharing
- Number of employees: >50
- Website: www.greenwheels.com www.greenwheels.nl

Greenwheels is the largest carsharing corporation in the Netherlands. Operations in the United Kingdom ceased on 1 March 2013, whilst Operations in Germany were halted in 2022.

The company was founded as Collect Car B.V. on 21 June 1995 by Gijs van Lookeren Campagne and Jan Borghuis, who were inspired by car sharing by German students in the 1980s. Now the biggest and most successful carsharing company of the Netherlands, Collect Car B.V., Rotterdam, - better known by its trademark 'Greenwheels' - is operating with cars throughout the country. The car sharing firm received a financial boost by Dutch entrepreneur Eckart Wintzen in 1997. In April 2013 it was announced that a consortium consisting of the Volkswagen Financial Services AG and the Dutch VW importer Pon Holdings B.V. acquired an unspecified amount of shares in CollectCar B.V..They became sole owners in 2015.

Currently Greenwheels runs a total fleet of 2.900 shared cars from the Volkswagen Group (VW), mostly types VW up! and e-up!, VW ID.3, VW Golf Variant, and VW Caddy.

== Locations ==
Greenwheels has extensive locations in mostly urban centres in the Netherlands. In the UK, operations were only in the boroughs of Wandsworth and Lambeth, and closed on 1 March 2013 because Greenwheels UK "did not have enough members to continue our services". German operations were handed over to a sister company in Germany in 2022.

== Fleet ==
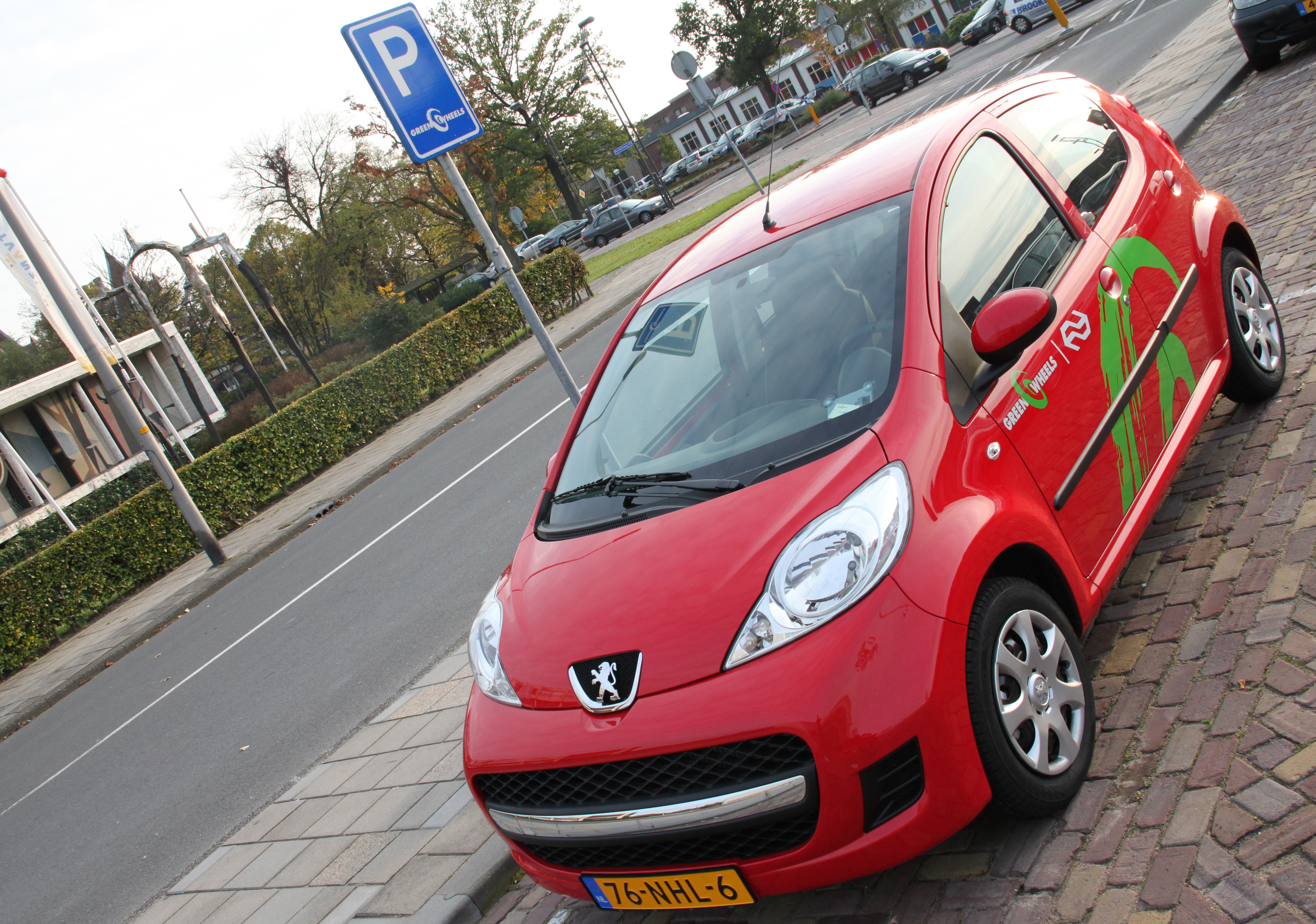
Greenwheels Peugeot 107 at Station Hengelo in the Netherlands

Greenwheels fleet consists of subcompact (supermini or city car) or compact (compact MPV, leisure vehicles) that are better able to handle the narrow and congested streets found in European cities.

In the Netherlands Greenwheels operates with mostly Volkswagen vehicles, VW up!, Variant, VW e-Up!, VW ID.3 and Caddy's:
