= Out of Control (Kelly book) =

1992 book by Kevin Kelly

Out of Control: The New Biology of Machines, Social Systems, and the Economic World
- Author: Kevin Kelly
- Publisher: Basic Books
- Publication date: 1992
- ISBN: 978-0201483406

Out of Control: The New Biology of Machines, Social Systems, and the Economic World (ISBN 978-0201483406) is a 1992 book by Kevin Kelly. Major themes in Out of Control are cybernetics, emergence, self-organization, complex systems, negentropy and chaos theory. The book can be seen as a work of techno-utopianism.

== Summary ==
The book's central theme is that several fields of contemporary science and philosophy point in the same direction: intelligence is not organized in a centralized structure but is much more like a beehive composed of small, simple components. Kelly applies this view to bureaucratic organizations, intelligent computers, and the human brain.

== Reception ==
Although the book was not widely reviewed upon its initial release in 1992, it gained visibility, was reviewed, and was extensively cited in subsequent years. Reviews often discussed Kelly's hive-mind analogy as a metaphor for the New Economy.

Reviewers have called the book a "mind-expanding exploration" (Publishers Weekly) and "the best of an important new genre" (Forbes ASAP).

Critics of the book have contended that its position precludes a critical approach to politics and social power.
