= Pet House =

Residence hall at Washington & Jefferson College

Coordinates: 40°10′14.5″N 80°14′23.2″W

The Pet House, also known as Monroe Hall, is a residence hall at Washington & Jefferson College that allows students to live with their family pets. It has been identified as part of a growing trend of pet-friendly dormitories across the United States.

== Facilities ==
Monroe Hall is part of the Presidents' Row cluster of residence halls. It is one of several other "Theme Communities" developed by the college; others include "Leadership & Service Community" and the "International House."

== Origins and growth ==
Plans for the Pet House began shortly after animal lover Tori Haring-Smith took office as college president in January 2005. She had been inspired by her own experience as a freshman at Swarthmore College, where she had a kitten. After pitching the idea of a Pet House to the board of trustees and the student body, many of whom have visions of "animal feces everywhere and dogs barking and keeping people awake." After persuading the rest of the administration that such a plan was feasible, college officials visited Eckerd College to see how their pet-friendly housing program operated. The Pittsburgh Post-Gazette reported in 2010 that "A recent visit to Monroe Hall found it quiet and clean. A large lawn around the dorm is where the pets can romp and play, often drawing the attention of students passing by. The pet owners are responsible for cleaning up after their pets."

During the 2009-10 school year, 10 students lived in the Pet House; that number jumped to 34 in the 2010-11 school year.

The college administration believes that the pet house provides a good on-campus experience and improves the college's competitiveness in recruiting potential students.

== Policies ==
The college only permits "family pets" that have been owned by the student's family for greater than one year. Cats, dogs (except large breeds), small birds, hamsters, gerbils, guinea pigs, turtles, and fish are all approved for the Pet House. All pets must have a clean bill of health from a veterinarian; all dogs and cats must be spayed or neutered. Pets are not permitted in the classroom. Moreover, your pet too should have a passport, if you want to take your pet abroad with you.
