= Linnaean enterprise =

Task of identifying species

The Linnaean enterprise is the task of identifying and describing all living species. It is named after Carl Linnaeus, a Swedish botanist, ecologist and physician who laid the foundations for the modern scheme of taxonomy.

As of 2006, the Linnaean enterprise is considered to be barely begun. There are estimated to be 10 million living species, but only about 1.5-1.8 million have been even named, and fewer than 1% of these have been studied enough to understand the basics of their ecological roles. Linnaean enterprise plays a larger role in applied science and basic science. With applied science, it can assist in finding new natural products and species (bioprospecting) and effective conservation practices. It allows for an understanding of evolutionary biology and how ecosystems function in basic science.

The cost of completing the Linnaean Enterprise has been estimated at US $5 billion.

== Name ==
Carl Linnaeus (1707–1778) was one of the most well known natural scientists of his time. Unsatisfied with the contemporary way of naming living things, he was responsible for creating the binomial nomenclature system still used in science to name species of organisms. Linnaeus's work laid the basis of modern taxonomy. As part of his work, Linnaeus formally described and classified numerous species of plants and animals, and created binomial (scientific) names that still are used today for many of the most common species in Europe. Notably, Linnaeus's taxonomic system was the first where humans were taxonomically grouped with apes, classifying both genus Homo as well as Simia (now defunct and replaced by several other genera) to be members of order Primates.

== See also ==
- Catalogue of Life
- Encyclopedia of Life
- Wikispecies
