= Wired (magazine) =

American technology magazine

- Cover of the November/December 2024 issue
- Global Editorial Director: Katie Drummond
- Former US editors-in-chief: Louis Rossetto, Katrina Heron, Chris Anderson, Scott Dadich, Nick Thompson, Gideon Lichfield
- Categories: Business, technology, lifestyle, thought leader
- Frequency: Bi-monthly
- Total circulation: 540,265 (2024)
- Founder: Louis Rossetto, Jane Metcalfe
- Founded: February 1991
- First issue: January 1993, as a quarterly
- Company: Condé Nast Publications
- Country: United States
- Based in: San Francisco, California
- Language: English
- Website: www.wired.com
- ISSN: 1059-1028 (print); 1078-3148 (web)
- OCLC: 24479723

Wired is a bimonthly American magazine that examines the impact of emerging technologies on culture, the economy, and politics. It is published in both print and online editions by Condé Nast. The magazine has been in publication since its launch in January 1993. Its editorial office is based in San Francisco, California, with its business headquarters located in New York City.

Wired quickly became recognized as the voice of the emerging digital economy and culture and a pace setter in print design and web design. From 1998 until 2006, the magazine and its website, Wired.com, experienced separate ownership before being fully consolidated under Condé Nast in 2006. It has won multiple National Magazine Awards and has been credited with shaping discourse around the digital revolution. The magazine coined the term crowdsourcing, as well as its annual tradition of handing out Vaporware Awards.

Wired has launched several international editions, including Wired UK, Wired Japan, Wired Czech Republic and Slovakia, Wired Germany and Wired Greece. The magazine was published monthly until 2024, when it switched to a bi-monthly schedule with six issues per year.

== History ==
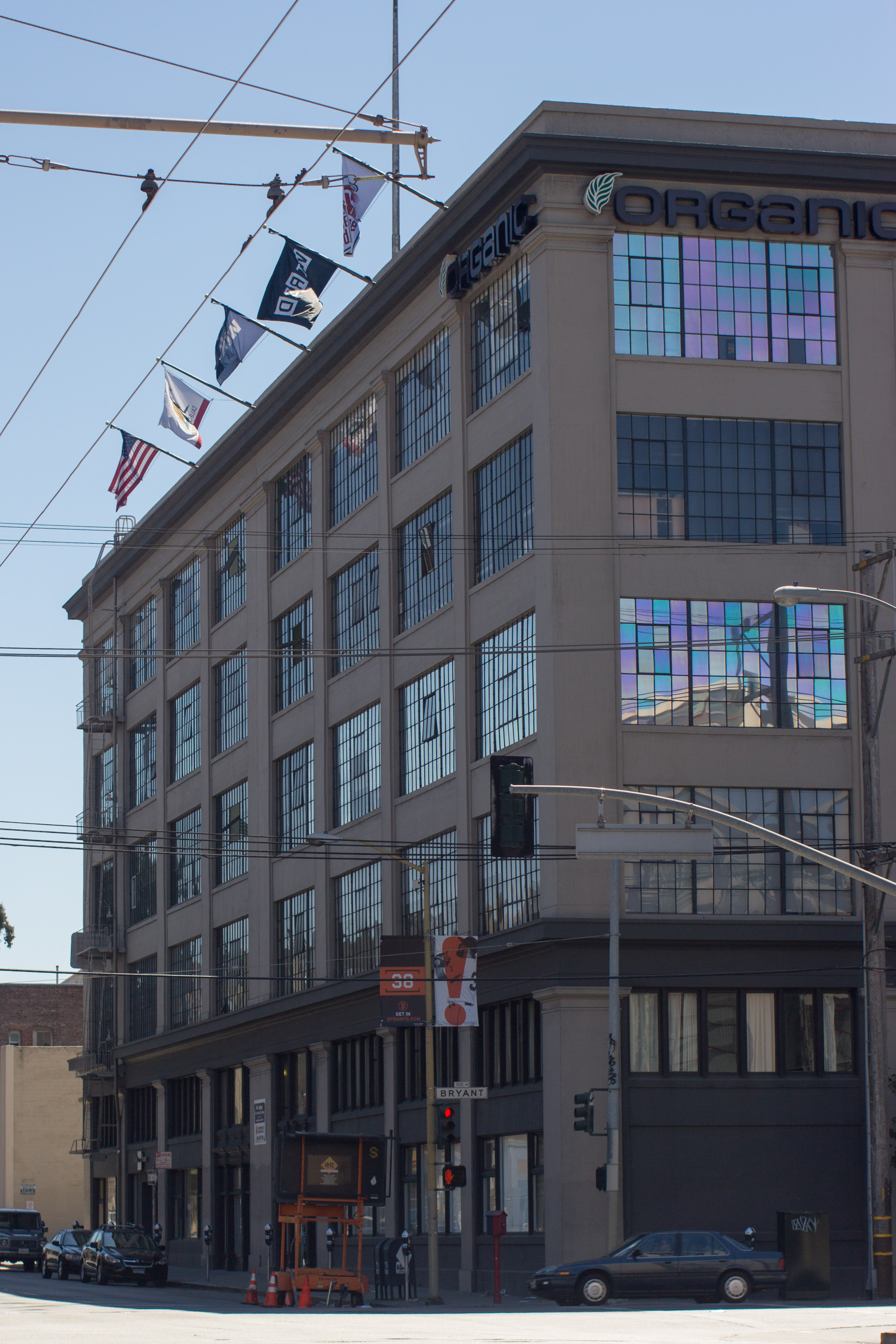
Wired building located in San Francisco

The magazine was launched in 1993 by American expatriates Louis Rossetto and his life and business partner, Jane Metcalfe. Wired was conceived in Amsterdam, the Netherlands, while they were working on Electric Word, a technology magazine that focused not just on hardware and software, but on the people, companies, and ideas that were part of what they called the language industries. Whole Earth Review called it "The Least Boring Computer Magazine in the World". This focus on the social, economic, and political issues surrounding technology became the core of the Wired editorial approach.

Initial funding for Wired was provided by Eckart Wintzen, a Dutch entrepreneur. His Origin software company extended a contract for advertising and bought the first 1000 subscribers. Rossetto and Metcalfe moved back to the United States to start Wired, finding the European Union not a cohesive enough media market to support a continent-wide publication.

Origin's upfront payment was the seed capital which saw Rossetto and Metcalfe through 12 fruitless months of fundraising. They approached established computer and lifestyle publishers, as well as venture capitalists, and met constant rejection. The Wired business concept was a radical departure. Computer magazines carried no lifestyle advertising, and lifestyle magazines carried no computer advertising. And Wired's target audience of "Digital Visionaries" was unknown.

Wired's fundraising breakthrough came when they showed a prototype to Nicholas Negroponte, founder and head of the MIT Media Lab at the February 1992 TED Conference, which Richard Saul Wurman comped them to attend. Negroponte agreed to become the first investor in Wired, but even before he could write his check, software entrepreneur Charlie Jackson deposited the first investor money in the Wired account a few weeks later. Negroponte was to become a regular columnist for six years (through 1998), wrote the book Being Digital, and later founded One Laptop per Child.

By September 1992, Wired had rented loft space in the SoMa district of San Francisco off South Park and hired its first employees. As Editor and CEO, Rossetto oversaw content and business strategy, and Metcalfe, as President and COO, oversaw advertising, circulation, finance, and company operations. Kevin Kelly was executive editor, John Plunkett creative director, and John Battelle managing editor. John Plunkett's wife and partner, Barbara Kuhr (Plunkett+Kuhr) later became the launch creative director of Wired's website Hotwired. They were to remain with Wired through the first six years of publication, 1993–98.

Rossetto and Metcalfe were aided in starting Wired by Ian Charles Stewart, who helped write the original business plan, John Plunkett, who designed the "Manifesto", Eugene Mosier, who provided production support to create the first prototype (and later became Art Director for Production), and Randy Stickrod, who provided Rossetto and Metcalfe refuge in his office on South Park when they first arrived in San Francisco. IDG's George Clark arranged nationwide newsstand distribution. Associate publisher Kathleen Lyman joined Wired from News Corporation and Ziff Davis to execute on its ambition to attract both technology and lifestyle advertising, and delivered from the first issue. She and her protégé Simon Ferguson (Wired's first advertising manager) landed pioneering campaigns by a diverse group of industry leaders such as Apple Computer, Intel, Sony, Calvin Klein, and Absolut. Lyman and Ferguson left in year two. Condé Nast veteran Dana Lyon then took over ad sales.

Cover of the June 1997 issue. The main article was about Apple Computer's NeXT acquisition, Steve Jobs' return as an "advisor" to then-CEO Gil Amelio, and Apple's dire straits at the time. It depicts the iconic Apple logo with a stylized "crown of thorns". The tagline "Pray" is a nod to the company's Apple evangelists and "devout" followers.

Two years after they left Amsterdam, and nearly five years after they first started work on the business plan, Metcalfe and Rossetto and their initial band of twelve Wired Ones launched Wired as a quarterly on 6 January 1993 and first distributed it by hand at Macworld Expo in San Francisco and, later that week, at the Consumer Electronics Show (CES) in Las Vegas. Copies arrived on newsstand two weeks later as Bill Clinton took office as President, with his Vice President Al Gore touting the Information Superhighway. Due to the work of John Battelle's fiancée, ex-CBS producer Michelle Scileppi, feature pieces on Wired’s launch appeared on CNN and in The San Jose Mercury News, Newsweek and Time magazines.

Circulation and advertising response was so strong that Wired went bi-monthly with its next issue, and monthly by September with the William Gibson cover story about Singapore called "Disneyland with the Death Penalty", which was banned there. In January 1994, Advance Publications's Condé Nast made a minority investment in Wired Ventures. And in April that year, Wired won its first National Magazine Award for General Excellence for its first year of publication. During Rossetto's five years as editor, it would be nominated for General Excellence every year, win the design award in 1996, and a second General Excellence in 1997.

Wired’s founding executive editor, Kevin Kelly, had been an editor of the Whole Earth Catalog, Co-Evolution Quarterly, and the Whole Earth Review. He brought with him contributing writers from those publications. Six authors of the first Wired issue (1.1) had written for Whole Earth Review, most notably Bruce Sterling (who was on the first cover) and Stewart Brand. Other contributors to Whole Earth who appeared in Wired included William Gibson, who was also featured on Wired's cover in its first year.

Wired co-founder Rossetto claimed in his launch editorial that "the Digital Revolution is whipping through our lives like a Bengali typhoon", a bold statement at the time, when there were no smart phones, web browsers, and less than 10 million users connected to the Internet around the world, barely half that in the United States. Bold also describes John Plunkett's graphic design, and its use of fluorescents and metallics. Uniquely for magazines, Wired was printed on a new, state of the art, high-end, six color press normally used for annual reports.

The first issue covered interactive games, cell-phone hacking, digital special effects, digital libraries, an interview with Camille Paglia by Stewart Brand, digital surveillance, Bruce Sterling's cover story about military simulations, and Karl Taro Greenfeld’s story on Japanese otaku. And while Wired was one of the first magazines to list the email addresses of its authors and contributors, the column by Nicholas Negroponte, while written in the style of an email message, surprisingly contained an obviously fake, non-standard email address.

That was remedied in the second issue. Wired first mentioned the World Wide Web in its third issue, after CERN put it in the public domain in April. Subsequently, Wired focused extensively on the networking explosion, carrying cover stories on Yahoo's origin story, Neal Stephenson's 50,000 word, epic essay on the laying of the fiber optic datalink from London to Japan, and Bill Gates' media strategy for Microsoft.

On October 27, 1994, 20 months after its first issue, and following the introduction of the first graphic web browser Mosaic, Wired Ventures launched its Hotwired website, the first with original content and Fortune 500 advertising. Inventing the banner ad, Wired brought ATT, Volvo, MCI, Club Med and seven other companies to the web for the first time on websites built by Jonathan Nelson's Organic Online. Among the launch crew of 12 was Jonathan Steuer, who led the group, Justin Hall, a pioneer blogger who ran his own successful site on the side, Howard Rheingold as executive editor, and Apache server co-creator Brian Behlendorf, who was webmaster.

Convinced the Web was the future of media, Wired expanded Hotwired using Condé Nast's investment into a suite of websites to include Ask Dr. Weil, Rough Guides, extreme sports, and cocktails. In 1996, it introduced its search engine HotBot in partnership with Berkeley startup Inktomi. Hotwired pioneered many of the features and techniques that would go on to define online journalism and online content creation in general. The web was so new at the time, Wired hired forty engineers to write the code for its edit and ad serving software. By the end of 1995, Hotwired ranked sixth among all websites for revenue, ahead of ESPN, CNET, and CNN.

The New York Times commented, "Wired is more than a successful magazine. Like Rolling Stone in the 60's, it has become the totem of a major cultural movement."

Wired's expansion accelerated. By 1996, it had launched a book publishing division (HardWired), licensed a Japanese edition with Dohosha Publishing, created a British edition (Wired UK) in a joint venture with the Guardian newspaper, and had signed with Gruner and Jahr to do a German edition to be headquartered in Berlin. And it began work on Wired TV in partnership with MSNBC, as well as three new magazine titles: a shelter book called Neo to be edited by Wired Editor-At-Large Katrina Heron and designed by Rhonda Rubenstein; a business magazine called The New Economy; and a concept magazine with New York design star Tibor Kalman focusing on the countdown to the new millennium.

In 1996, reacting to the IPOs of web competitors Yahoo, Lycos, Excite, and Infoseek, Wired Ventures announced its own IPO. It selected Goldman Sachs and Robertson Stephens as co-leads, with Goldman managing. The June IPO was postponed when the market declined. When it finally went out in October, Goldman was unable to close the round following another market downturn, and Wired withdrew its IPO.

Fingerpointing followed. Some observers claimed the market rejected Wired's $293 million "internet valuation" as too rich for a traditional publishing company. Wired claimed its valuation was confirmed by savvy private investors who put $12.5 million into the company in May at just under the original offering stock price. It also argued that the offering price set by the bankers was merited for pioneering web media, and its revenue at Hotwired was greater than Yahoo's when it went public at a higher valuation than Wired's. Wired executives blamed Goldman for mismanaging their IPO and not closing the round which already had investors booked. The Goldman executive who managed the IPO is quoted as saying "Had the market not been so volatile, I believe the offering would have been quite successful."

The IPO failure left Wired Ventures cash-strapped. It turned to its current investor Tudor Investment Corporation. Tudor brought on Providence Equity Capital, concluding a private funding at the end of December 1996. Wired then proceeded to cut costs by focusing on its US magazine and web businesses, shutting its UK magazine, its book company, and its TV operation, and terminating work on new magazines. By June, Wired magazine was profitable. The web company, now rebranded Wired Digital, was growing. Wired execs wanted to try to go public again in 1998, catching what was to be the second run-up in internet stocks which resulted in the 1999 dot-com bubble. In 1996, Wired Digital made up 7 percent of the company's revenues, and in 1997 it pulled in 30 percent. The unit was expected to contribute about 40 percent of revenues in 1998.

Providence and Tudor had other plans, and hired Lazard Freres to shop the company. Rossetto and Metcalfe lost control of Wired Ventures in March 1998. The Street.com commented that a "company that started out as one of the more promising bastions of the digital revolution lost control to old-fashioned vulture capitalism".

Providence/Tudor quickly cut a deal to sell the magazine to Miller Publishing for $77 million. When Wired Ventures investor Condé Nast heard about the deal through a leak to a Silicon Valley gossip columnist, they peremptorily outbid Miller and bought Wired magazine for $90 million. The month of the sale, Wired’s magazine and web businesses became cashflow positive. Condé Nast declined to buy Wired Digital. Four months later, Providence/Tudor sold Wired Digital to Lycos.

The deal almost did not close. Wired Ventures's founders and early investors threatened lawsuits against Tudor and Providence for breach of fiduciary responsibility, claiming they were engaging in unfair distribution of proceeds from the sale amounting to $50-100 million. Ultimately, the controlling investors relented, and the deal closed in June 1999 for $285 million. At that point, Wired Digital was also cashflow positive. Combined proceeds of the two sales exceeded the Wired Ventures valuation at the time of its failed IPO.

Rossetto's penultimate issue was five years after his first, in January 1998. Appropriately, the issue was entitled "Change is Good", Wired's unofficial slogan. In his last issue in February, he ushered in a complete redesign of the magazine, the first since its start. Katrina Heron became Wired’s second editor-in-chief with the March 1998 issue.

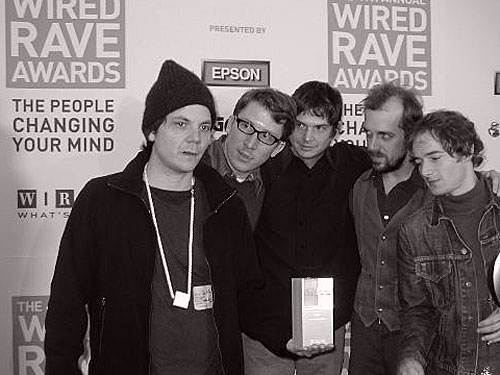
Wilco at the Wired Rave Awards in 2003

Wired magazine's new owner Condé Nast kept the editorial offices in San Francisco, but moved the business offices to New York. Wired survived the dot-com bubble under the business leadership of publisher Drew Schutte who expanded the brands reach by launching The Wired Store and Wired NextFest. In 2001 Wired found new editorial direction under editor-in-chief Chris Anderson, making the magazine's coverage "more mainstream". The print magazine's average page length, however, declined significantly from 1996 to 2001 and then again from 2001 to 2003.

In 2006, Condé Nast repurchased Wired Digital from Lycos, returning the website to the same company that published the magazine, reuniting the brand. In 2009, Condé Nast Italia launched the Italian edition of Wired and Wired.it. On April 2, 2009, Condé Nast relaunched the UK edition of Wired, edited by David Rowan, and launched Wired.co.uk. "Geekipedia: 149 People, Places, Ideas and Trends you need to know now" was a one-off paperback supplement to WIRED 15.09 published on January 1, 2007.

In August 2023, Katie Drummond was announced as the new editor of Wired. In 2025, during the second presidency of Donald Trump, Wired became noted for breaking numerous stories about the Trump administration and Elon Musk's Department of Government Efficiency (DOGE). Musk criticized the magazine, saying Wired "went from being about technology to being an unreadable, far-left wing propaganda mouthpiece." In response to criticisms, Wired editor Katie Drummond said, "If you still don’t understand why Wired covers politics, you are either willfully ignorant or a complete idiot."

In August 2025, Jacob Furedi, the former deputy editor of UnHerd and editor of the publication Dispatch, investigated articles on Business Insider and Wired written by a supposed freelancer named Margaux Blanchard after receiving an email. After concluding that the articles were AI-generated, he contacted Press Gazette. Both Business Insider and Wired subsequently removed the articles.

In April 2026, the magazine announced its Italian print edition will cease.

== Online magazine ==
Wired's web presence started with its launch of Hotwired.com in October 1994. Hotwired was the first website with original content and Fortune 500 advertising. Hotwired grew into a variety of vertical content sites, including Webmonkey, Ask Dr. Weil, Talk.com, WiredNews, and the search engine Hotbot. In 1997, all were rebranded under Wired Digital. The Wired.com website, formerly known as Wired News and Hotwired, launched in October 1994. The website and magazine were split in 1998, when the former was sold to Condé Nast and the latter to Lycos in September 1998. The two remained independent until Condé Nast purchased Wired News on July 11, 2006. This move finally reunited the Wired brand.

As of February 2018, Wired.com is paywalled. Users may only access a limited number of articles per month without payment.

Today, Wired.com hosts several technology blogs on topics in security, business, new products, culture, and science.

NextFest

Wired NextFest

From 2004 to 2008, Wired organized an annual "festival of innovative products and technologies". A NextFest for 2009 was canceled. In 2018, Wired hosted "Wired 25", a celebration of its 25 years, an event which included Jeff Bezos, Jack Dorsey, and many of the other founders of the tech industry.

== See also ==
- Hack Canada (1998) organization run by hackers and phreakers
- "Why the Future Doesn't Need Us"
- Whole Internet User's Guide and Catalog
