= TCHO =

Berkeley, California craft chocolate maker

TCHO Ventures, Inc
- Type: Subsidiary
- Industry: Food
- Founded: 2005
- Founder: Timothy Childs & Karl Bittong
- Headquarters: Berkeley, California, United States
- Key people: Hiro Tamai (CEO); Brad Kintzer (Chief Chocolate Maker)
- Products: Chocolate bars, couverture chocolate, cacao nibs, plant-based chocolate
- Owner: Ezaki Glico
- Website: tcho.com

TCHO is a plant-based chocolate maker based in Berkeley, California that promotes itself as working with cacao bean farmers and cooperatives to improve growing, fermentation and drying methods. The company's factory and headquarters were previously located on Pier 17 along the Embarcadero, in San Francisco's historic waterfront district, but moved to the West Berkeley section of Berkeley. In February 2018, it was announced that TCHO would be bought by the Japanese confectionery company Ezaki Glico.

== History ==
TCHO was co-founded in December 2005 by Timothy Childs, a technology and chocolate entrepreneur who once developed vision systems for NASA's Space Shuttle program, and Karl Bittong, a 40-plus year veteran of the chocolate industry.

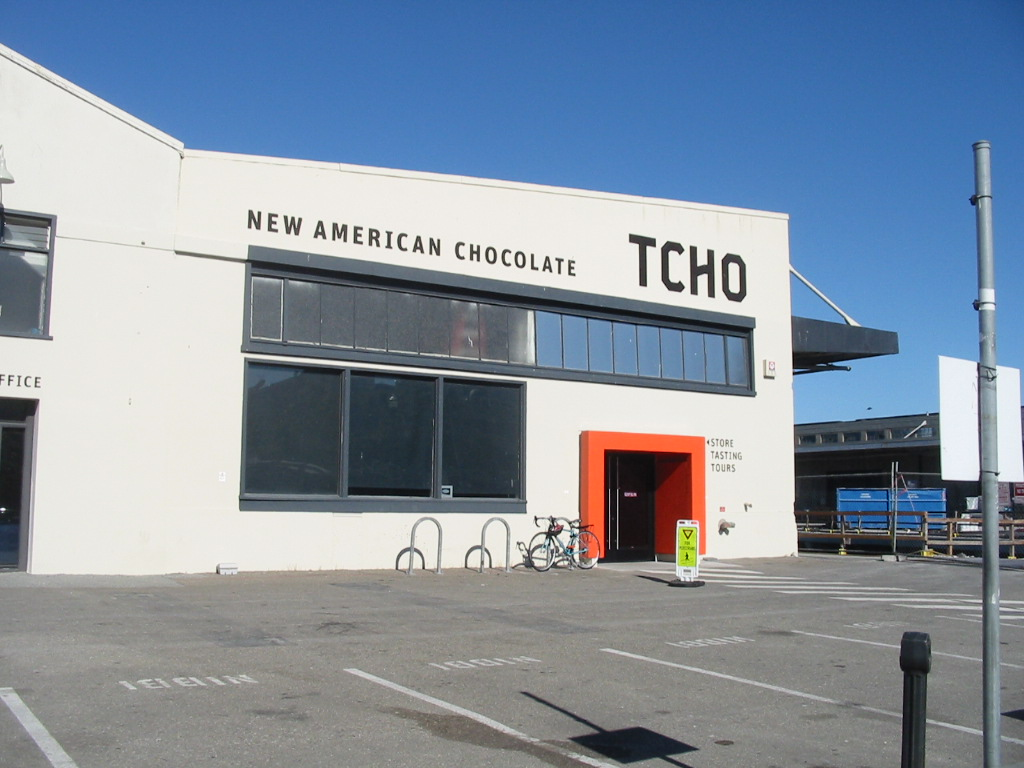
Former headquarters on Pier 17

In 2006, the company moved to Pier 17, a historic pier built in 1912 and the third-oldest pier there. Historically, the pier has been used for transport, military logistics, and trade, including the trade of cacao beans to San Francisco. The TCHO chocolate factory was assembled by a team of engineers using vintage German machines and modern refiners and grinders. In April 2014 TCHO left Pier 17 and moved their offices and factory to Berkeley, California.

TCHO teamed with Erik Spiekermann of Edenspiekermann for design and branding. Its packaging design have won awards and honors, including the Academy of Chocolate Gold Award in February 2009, the European Design Gold Award in May 2009, the iF communication design award in August 2009, as well as nominations for the 2009 Cannes Design Lions and 2011 German Federal Design Award.

In 2021, the company announced that it would stop using dairy and transition its entire product line to be plant-based. The transition was complete by September 2022.

== Products ==
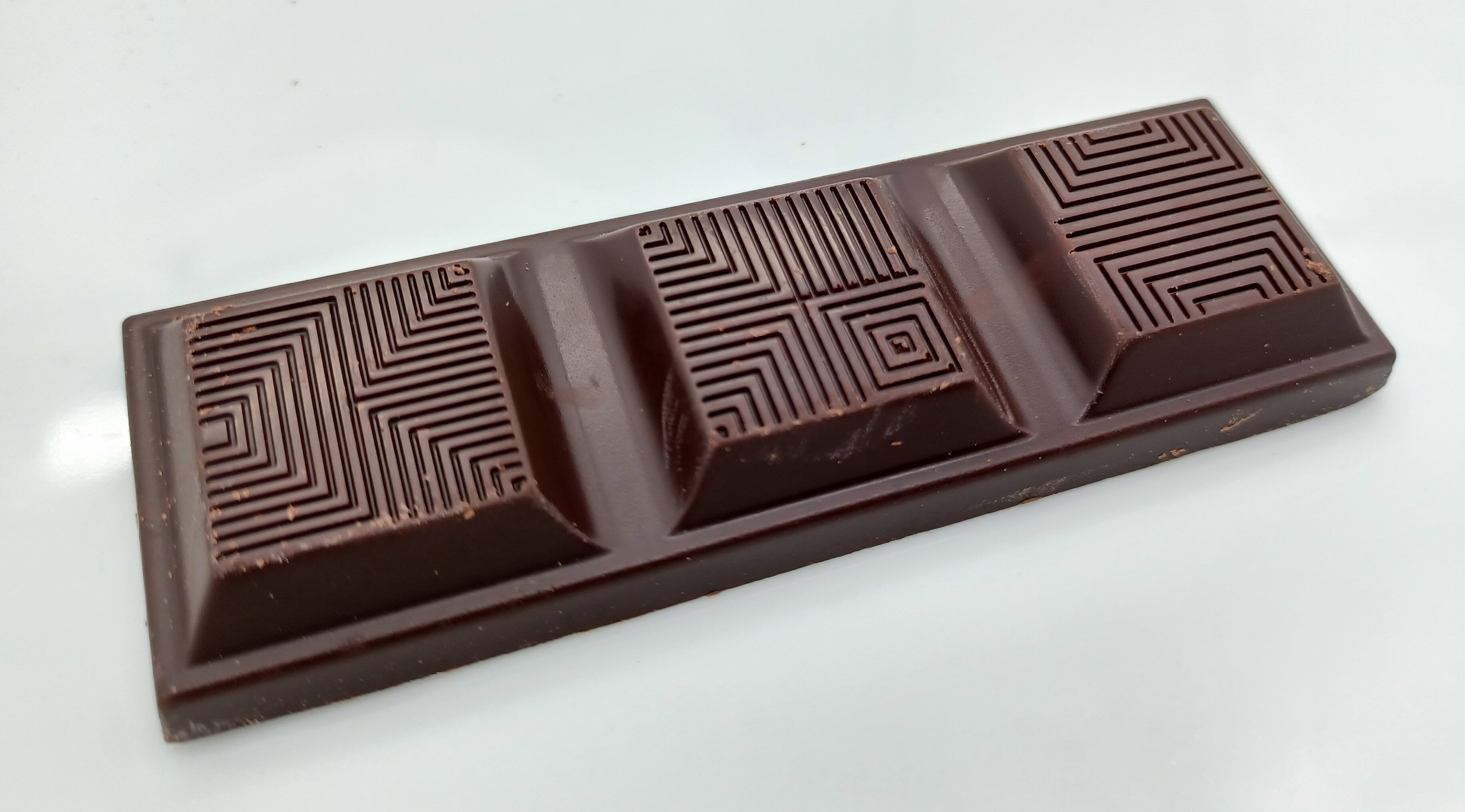
A TCHO plant-based dark chocolate bar

The company manufacturers two single-origin dark chocolate bars, plant-based chocolate bars, drinking chocolate, cocoa powder, roasted cacao nibs and baking chocolate. It primarily sells its products to United States retailers. They also offer wholesale options and bulk for chocolatiers and makers.

== TCHO Source ==
TCHO promotes its direct investment in partnerships with cacao farmers through its TCHO Source Program, where it aims to provide farmers with the technology and know-how in 'open source' fashion. "Flavor Labs" have been installed at co-ops throughout the world for farmers.

== See also ==
- List of bean-to-bar chocolate manufacturers
