= Art Research Center =

The Art Research Center is an independent not-for-profit association in Kansas City, Missouri. In its early days, members included architects, artists, composers, designers, writers and others. Its work was connected with the exploration of abstract Neo-Constructivism, by both individuals and groups. The association grew out of an earlier collaborative art gallery project, and was started by Thomas Michael Stephens in 1964. The first exhibition was held in 1966. In 1969, Stephens, with Jon Brees Thogmartin and Nancy Ann Stephens, took work by eight artists of the group to the fourth New Tendencies exhibition in Zagreb, at that time in Yugoslavia; the works were displayed as a group, forming a cohesive whole.

The Art Research Center's first exhibition ran from October 29, 1966 to January 31, 1967 at a branch of the Kansas City public library. Seven members participated in the first ARC exhibition.

== The ARC Welders ==
The Art Research Center often recruited artists and musicians to participate in live music concerts. These concerts included improvised ensemble works by the "ARC Welders." The ARC Welders in general, consisted of the musicians who happened to be participating in any given event.

At least one of the ARC Welders concerts received favorable reviews from The Kansas City Star.

== Associated movements ==
- Drop Art
- Drop City
- Criss-Cross
