= Drop City =

Abandoned rural hippie commune in Colorado, US

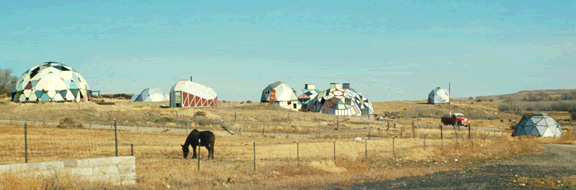
- Interactive map of Drop City
- Coordinates: 37°13′21.69″N 104°29′23.15″W
- Country: United States
- State: Colorado
- County: Las Animas County
- Founded: 1960
- Dissolved: 1979
- Founder: Gene Bernofsky ("Curly"); JoAnn Bernofsky ("Jo"); Richard Kallweit ("Lard"); Clark Richert ("Clard")

Government
  - Type: Commune

Drop City was a counterculture artists' community that formed near the town of Trinidad in southern Colorado in 1960. Abandoned by 1979, Drop City became known as the first rural "hippie commune".

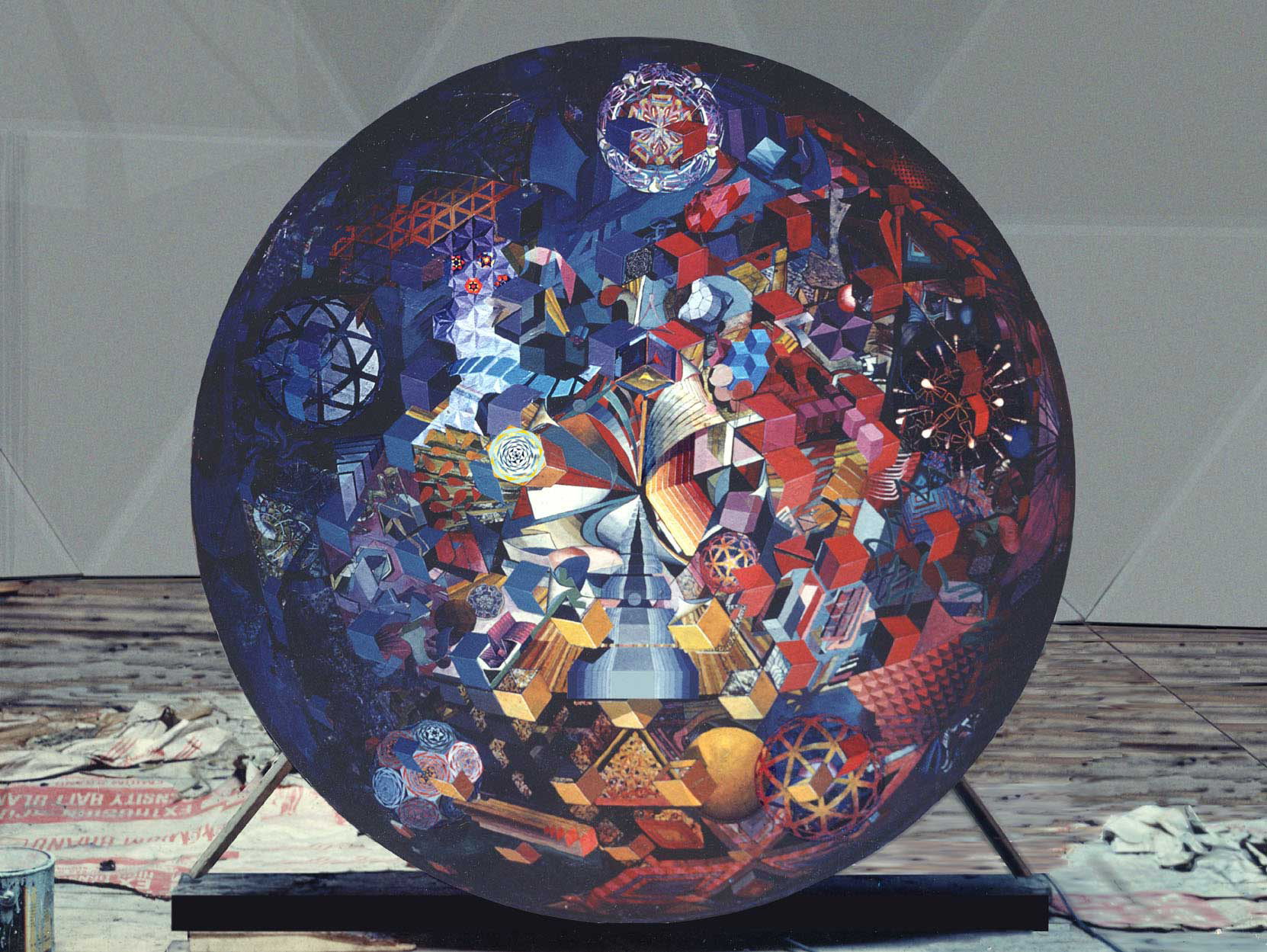
The Ultimate Painting, by Drop Artists, 1966, acrylic on panel, 60" × 60"

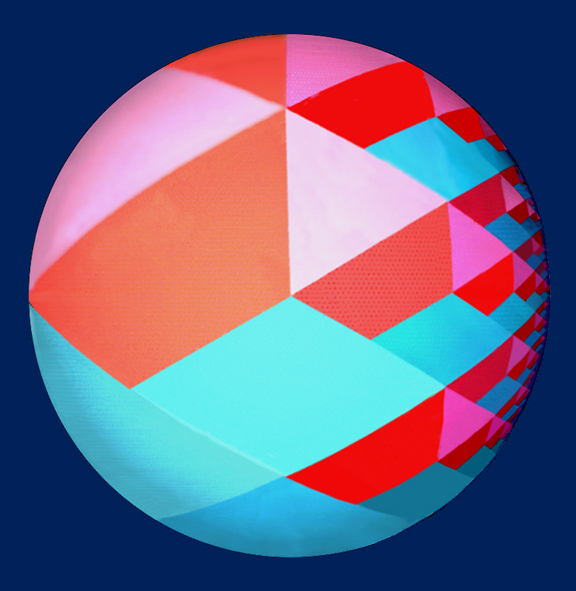
Pythagorean Tree, by Drop Artists, 1967, acrylic on panel, 48" diam.

== Establishment ==
In 1960, the four original founders, Gene Bernofsky ("Curly Benson"), JoAnn Bernofsky ("Drop Lady"), Richard Kallweit ("Larry Lard"), and Clark Richert ("Clard Svenson"), art students and filmmakers from the University of Kansas and University of Colorado, bought a 7-acre (28,000 m^{2}) tract of land about four miles (6 km) north of Trinidad, in southeastern Colorado. Their intention was to create a live-in work of Drop Art, continuing an art concept they had developed earlier at the University of Kansas. Drop Art (sometimes called "droppings") was informed by the "happenings" of Allan Kaprow and the impromptu performances, a few years earlier, of John Cage, Robert Rauschenberg, and Buckminster Fuller, at Black Mountain College.

As Drop City gained notoriety in the 1960s underground, people from around the world came to stay and work on the construction projects. Inspired by the architectural ideas of Buckminster Fuller and Steve Baer, residents constructed domes and zonohedra to house themselves, using geometric panels made from the metal of automobile roofs and other inexpensive materials. In 1967 the group, now consisting of 10 core people, won Buckminster Fuller's Dymaxion award for their constructions. The Firesign Theatre folks had a commercial—"kids, tear the top off your daddy's car, and send it, together with 10 cents in cash or coin, to Drop City, Colorado..."

== Aftermath ==
The community grew in reputation and size, accelerated by media attention, including news reports on national television networks. Gene "Curly" Bernofsky later wrote that nationwide attention contributed to the commune's demise. The peak of Drop City's fame was the Joy Festival in June 1967, which attracted hundreds of hippies, some of whom stayed on. Matthews writes that Bernofsky hid in his dome throughout the Joy Festival, and quit, disgusted, the very next day. With the complex of eight domes and geometric buildings constructed, Curly and Jo, the only official owners of the property, signed it over to a non-profit corporation consisting of the entire core group (then about a dozen). The deed stipulated that the land was "forever free and open to all people". But tensions and personality conflicts were already a problem within the group, and soon became unbearable. By the end of 1968, some of the original occupants of the community had moved to Boulder, Colorado, to start an artists' cooperative, "Criss-Cross", whose purpose, like Drop City's, was to function in a "synergetic" interaction between peers (no bosses) to create experimental artistic innovation. Among the innovative endeavors to evolve out of Drop City are:

- in 1969, the early solar energy company – Zomeworks, in Albuquerque, NM;
- the artists' group "Criss-Cross", operative in New York and Colorado in the 1970s;
- the development of Baer and Richert's discovery, the "61-Zone System," by Zometool Inc. of Longmont, Colorado;
- and in the early 1980s, an important discovery of a cubic fusion of interpenetrating fractal tetrahedra by Richard Kallweit.

At Drop City, debris and building remnants from the original settlement remain at the site today, though it is not inhabited. By 1979 it was abandoned, and the members of the non-profit who were still in touch decided to sell off the site to the cattle rancher next door. The last of the iconic domes was taken down only in the late 1990s, by a truck repair facility which now occupies a portion of the site.

== Legacy ==
By 1970, many intentional communities had developed in Southern Colorado and Northern New Mexico, some of which were inspired by Drop City. Libre, north of Gardner, Colorado, was founded by several ex-"Droppers", and was among the more well known. Some communities continue to exist in some form today (notably in the Taos, NM area).

In 1971, author, and Drop City resident, Peter Rabbit's memoir "Drop City" was published.

In 1993, an Indie Rock band from Sydney, Australia formed using the name Drop City. In 2007, a different, Denver based, Indie Rock band formed with the same name.

In 2003, author T. C. Boyle's novel Drop City was published.

In 2010, inspired by the Drop City commune, COMUNE opened a Drop City gallery space in the Los Angeles area.

In 2012, the documentary Drop City was released, directed by Joan Grossman.

In 2014, the indie rock band Ultimate Painting released its first album. The band and its eponymous first album are named after one of the paintings made by the Drop City community.

== See also ==
- Freetown Christiania
- Morningstar commune
- Taylor Camp
- Slab City, California

== Footnotes ==
=== Sources ===
- Curl, John (2007). Memories of Drop City, The First Hippie Commune of the 1960s and the Summer of Love, a memoir. iUniverse. ISBN 978-0-595-42343-9. OCLC 175218649.
- "Drop City newsletter", The Drop City Newsletter., Drop City, 1966, OCLC 34330556
- Matthews, Mark (2010). Droppers: America's First Hippie Commune, Drop City. University of Oklahoma Press. ISBN 978-0-8061-4058-2. OCLC 1043546992.
- Miller, Timothy. "Roots of Communal". thefarm.org. Archived from the original on 2006-08-11.
- Rabbit, Peter (1971). Drop City. The Olympia Press, Inc. OCLC 536640. ASIN B0006VUQEI.
