= University of Neyshabur =

Public university in Neyshabur

- دانشگاه نیشابور; Danushgah-e Neyshabur
- Coat of arms of the University of Neyshabur
- Type: Public
- Established: 2000
- Affiliations: Ministry of Science, Research and Technology; Ferdowsi University of Mashhad (Up until its academic independence)
- President: Hassan Sadeghi Samarjani
- Vice-president: Mehdi Mehrani Rad
- Academic staff: 250
- Administrative staff: 60
- Undergraduates: 15000
- Postgraduates: 4000
- Location: Neyshabur, Khorasan Razavi, 9319774446, Iran; 36.255°N 58.794°E (Main campus)
- Campus: Urban
- Language: Persian/English
- Colours: Turquoise
- Website: neyshabur.ac.ir

The University of Neyshabur (or Nishapur (Note: This university is named after the historic and the current city of Nishapur which is also Romanized as ''Neyshabur''. Both spellings are correct, however, only one of the spellings is used legally.)) (Persian: دانشگاه نیشابور) is a public university in Nishapur, Iran. Its main campus consists of three faculties located on the northwest of the residential area of the city. The University of Neyshabur also has an off-campus fine arts faculty. For ease of transportation, a campus bus line is in service between the campus and the site (campus) of the fine arts faculty. Up until its academic independence, the University of Neyshabur had been an affiliate of Ferdowsi University of Mashhad.

== History ==
In 1992, Neyshabur (/neɪʃɑ:bu:r/) branch campus of Ferdowsi University of Mashhad (FUM) with two fields of Food Engineering and Social Sciences Research was established. Subsequently, in 1999, a FUM affiliate of Faculty of Arts began to operate. This faculty was officially authorized to admit students and confer degrees in Painting, Graphic Design and also Sculpture as a new addition in 2003. In 2006, following the final agreement of Higher Education Office, Neyshabur Faculty of Arts was elevated to Neyshabur Higher Education Complex by adding the Faculty of Letters and Humanities and Faculty of Basic Sciences. In 2009, Higher Education Office announced its approval on the definitive disjuncture of Neyshabur Higher Education Complex from FUM. Then, the University of Neyshabur kept running with eight fields of study in bachelor's degree and three buildings.

Now, the University of Neyshabur is running educational and research activities with four active faculties including, Basic Sciences, Engineering, Humanities, and Arts in ten fields of study at undergraduate level including, Mathematics, Statistics, Physics, Electrical Engineering, Persian Language & Literature, English Language & Literature, Archeology, Sculpture, Painting, Graphic Design, and ten fields of study at graduate level including, Nuclear Physics, Solid Physics, Pure Mathematics, Archeology, Fundamental Particle Physics, Physical Chemistry, Mathematics, Archeology, Persian Language & Literature, Imagery and Art Research.

== Faculties ==
The University of Neyshabur has four faculties:

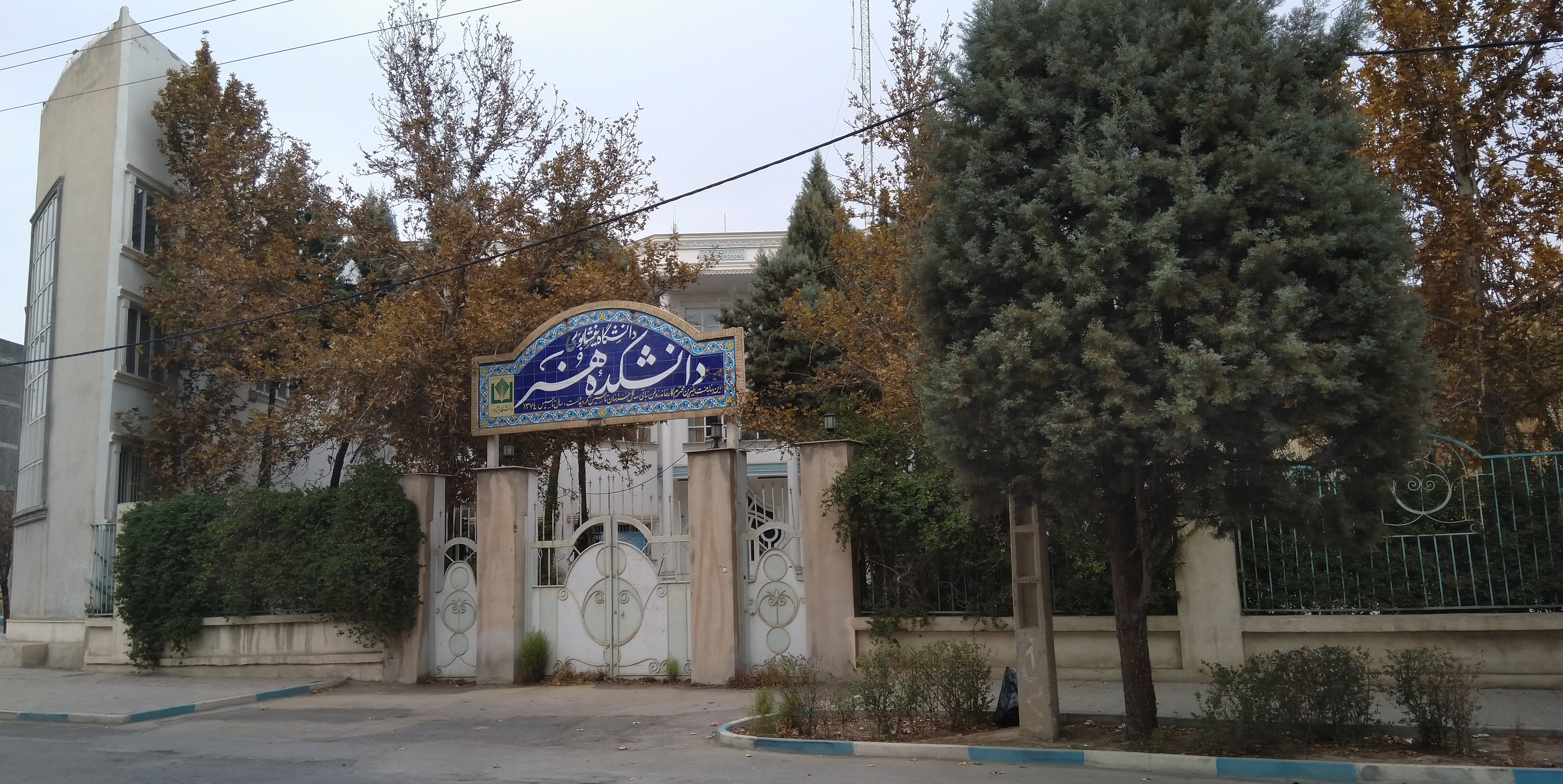
The western gate of the Faculty of Fine Arts, University of Neyshabur

=== Faculty of Fine Arts ===
The first and the oldest faculty, which has been active, is the Faculty of Fine Arts.

- Painting Department: This department admits full-time students for bachelor's program in painting.
- Graphic Design Department: This department admits undergraduate students in graphic design and graduate students in graphic design, imagery, and animation.
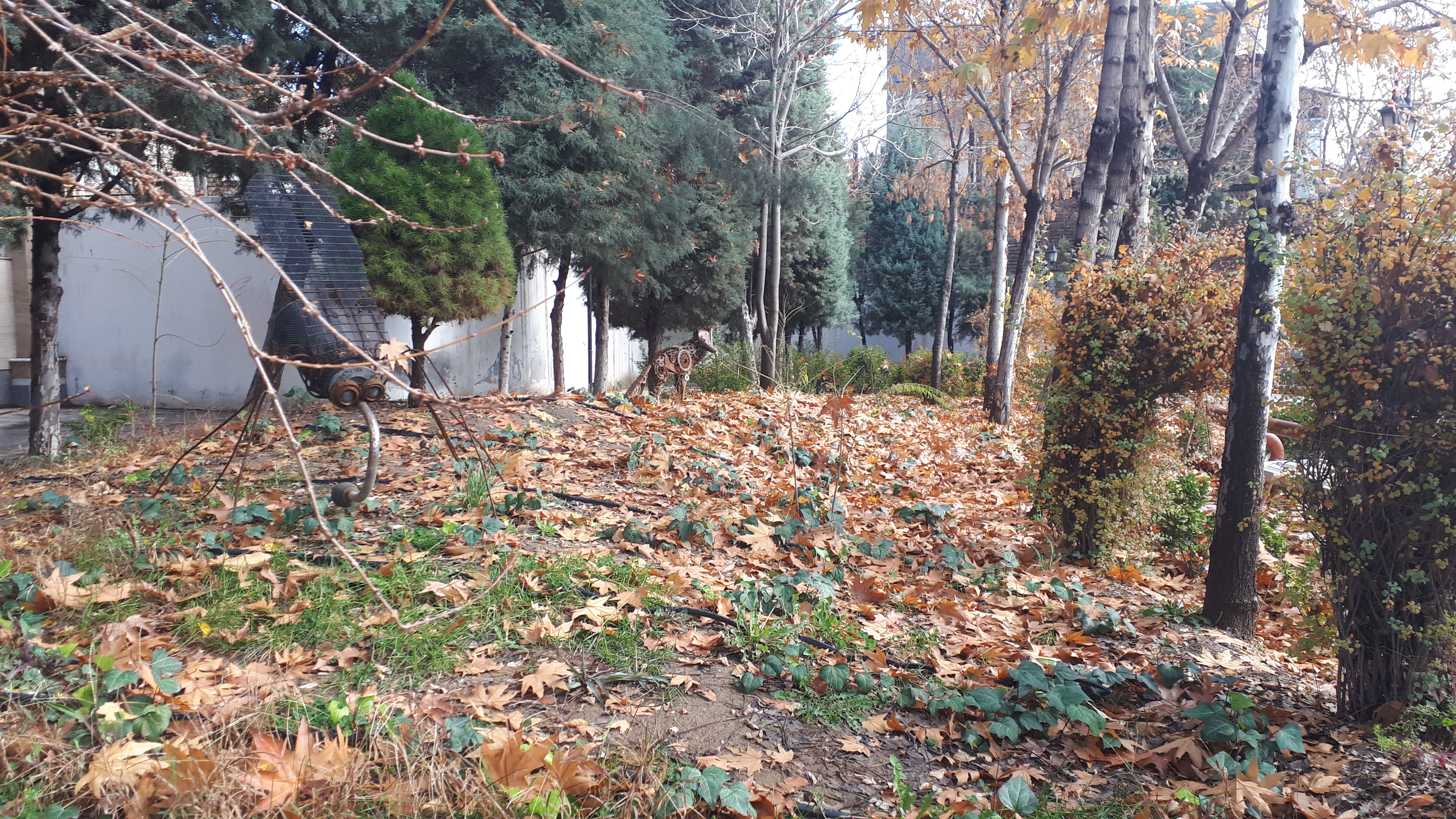
- Sculptures at the faculty of fine arts grounds, November of 2018
  Sculpture Department: This department admits full-time students at undergraduate level in sculpture with different professions (abstract and figurative areas).
- Art Research Department: In 2012, this department was established by admitting graduate students.

=== Faculty of Humanities ===
This faculty started with the establishment of two fields of study including, English Language & Literature and Archeology.

- Persian Language and Literature Department: This department admits students for both undergraduate and graduate program.
- English Language and Literature Department: This department admits students for bachelor's program .
- Archeology Department: This department admits students for both undergraduate and graduate program .
- Facilities of the Faculty of Humanities: English laboratory provides students of this faculty with educational services through using sound system, visual system and satellite network.

=== Faculty of Basic Sciences ===
In 2006, the faculty of basic sciences was established by admitting undergraduate students in Physics, which is the most populated faculty of the University of Neyshabur by the extension of the fields of study to three in bachelor's program and six in master's program, and 21 faculty members.

- Mathematics and Statistics Departments: These departments admit students at undergraduate level (mathematics & physics) and at graduate level (applied mathematics & pure mathematics) with the presence of nine full-time instructors and assistant professors.
- Physics and Chemistry Departments: These departments admit undergraduate students in physics and graduate students in subdisciplines of solid-state physics, nuclear physics, fundamental particle physics and physical chemistry with the presence of twelve full-time instructors and assistant professors.
- Facilities of the Faculty of Sciences: Laboratories: The collection of laboratories of the faculty is in operation in a more than 300 square meters space which has been equipped with advanced appliances. Therefore, students' projects and instructors' research studies can be conducted by means of these facilities.

=== Faculty of Engineering ===
Faculty of engineering is the newest faculty of the University of Neyshabur which started by admitting students in electrical engineering (with four subdisciplines of telecommunications, power, electronic and control) in 2014. Currently, the department of electrical engineering has five experienced and professional faculty members, and unique laboratory and workshop services. In the near future, a 3600 square meters building will be available for the faculty.

- Electrical Engineering Department: This department admits students for undergraduate program with four subdisciplines of telecommunication, power, electronic, and control by the presence of five full-time faculty members.
- Laboratory and workshop facilities of the engineering faculty: Faculty of engineering has a collection of laboratory and workshop facilities in a more than 300 square meters space.

== Research and facilities ==
- Institute of Neyshabur Studies: This institute is located in the Faculty of Arts which is established for the future of the University as a point to express solidarity of diverse activities over history, culture, literature and to qualify these activities at a university level with scientific perspective.
- Institute for Astronomy & Cosmology, University of Neyshabur (IACUN): In order to commemorate, preserve, and propagate the manner of Khayyam,various activities have been done in Neyshabur City including different Astronomical Associations, Astronomical Complexes, and Planetarium of Khayyam.
- Library: The library of the university provides the required educational and research services for students and instructors in two separate spaces.
- Computer site: The computer site of the university provides educational and research services for students and instructors.
- The Central Laboratory: In 2016, the central laboratory was established with the aim of centralized managing of the collection of laboratories and workshops of the faculties of basic sciences and engineering. One of the aims of the central laboratory is to provide out-of-college laboratory and workshop services to industrial companies, research organizations and researchers.
