= Steve Baer =

American architect (1938–2024)

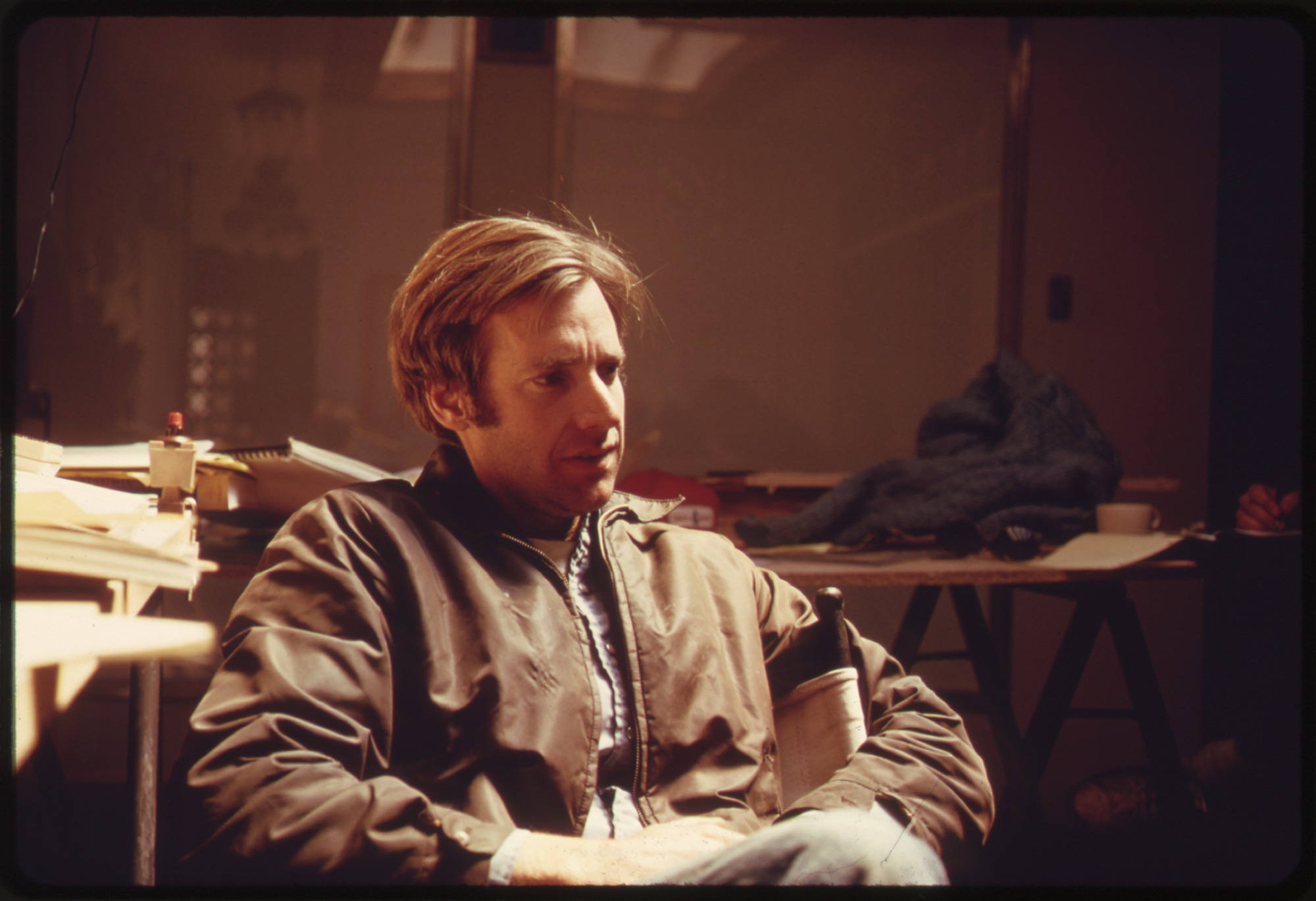
- Baer in 1974
- Born: Stephen C. Baer; October 13, 1938; Los Angeles, California, U.S.
- Died: May 17, 2024 (aged 85)
- Education: Eidgenössische Technische Hochschule
- Occupations: Solar-applications innovator; author
- Years active: 1965-2023
- Organizations: New Mexico Solar Energy Association; International Solar Energy Society
- Known for: Zome Architecture; passive-solar methods & devices; Zometool
- Notable work: Zome invention
- Awards: UNESCO Global Award for Sustainable Architecture"

Steve Baer (October 13, 1938 – May 17, 2024) was an American solar energy inventor and pioneer of passive solar technology. Originally, as a largely self-taught designer and builder, he worked on small projects in Colorado and New Mexico; in time he and Zomeworks, the company he founded, achieved international recognition.

Baer successfully obtained a number of solar-technology patents, contributed to industry publications, and wrote five books (some of which, in part, publicized Zomeworks' design innovations and products). Baer served on the board of directors of the U.S. Section of the International Solar Energy Society, and on the board of the New Mexico Solar Energy Association. He was the founder, chairman of the board, president, and director of research at Zomeworks Corporation. Baer pioneered and helped popularize the use of Zomes, being considered the creator of Zome Architecture.

He was one of the creators of Zometool, a construction set educational toy or device that had evolved from playground climbers and other structures that had been created by Zomeworks.

== Early life ==
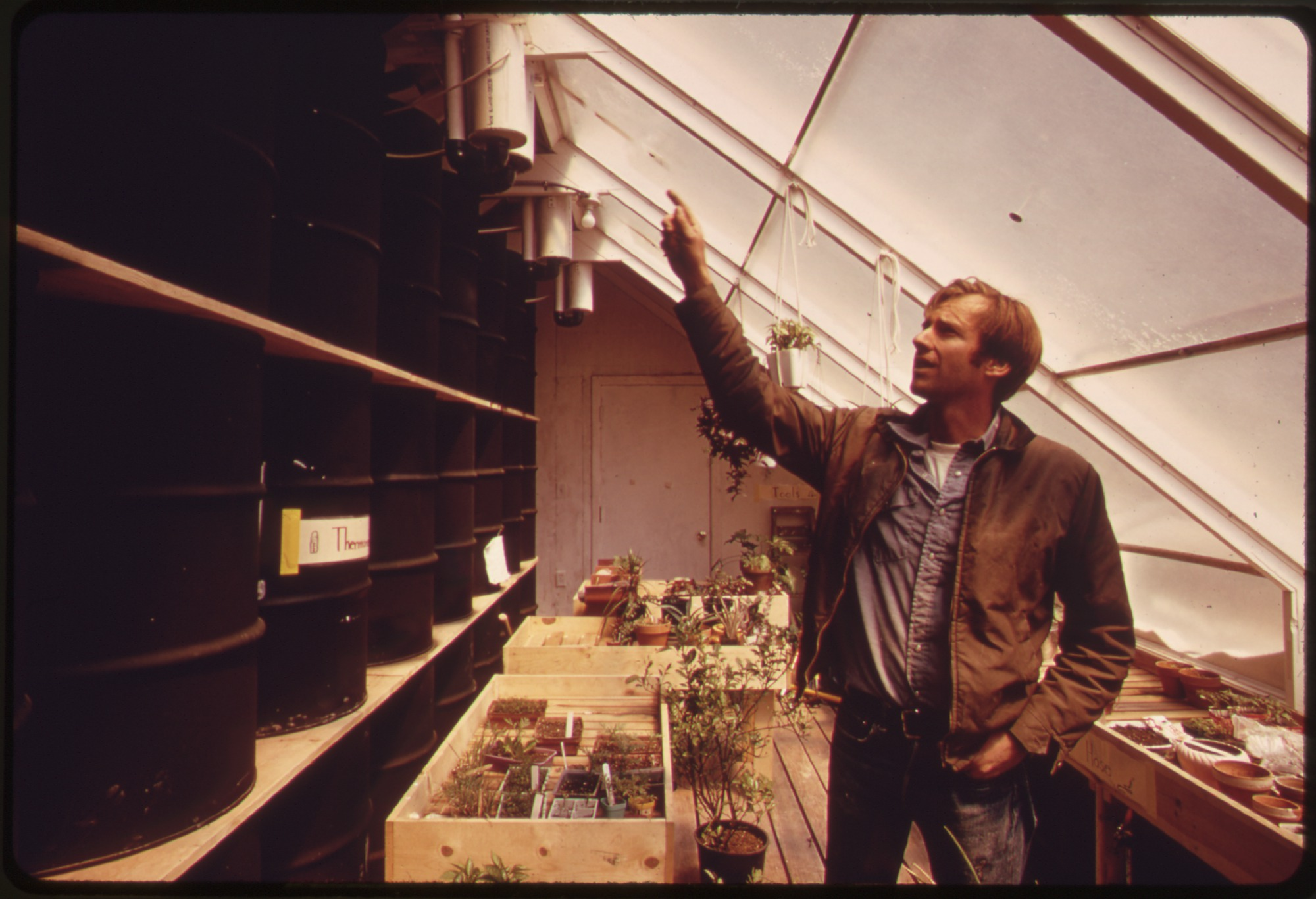
Baer inside a highly efficient greenhouse he built for a school in Albuquerque, NM (1974)

Steve Baer was born in Los Angeles. In his teens, while a student at Midland School, he read Lewis Mumford and decided technology need not degrade or complicate people's lives.

Immediately after graduating from Midland School, Baer worked at various jobs, travelled throughout Mexico, and attended Amherst College and UCLA.

In 1960, he joined the U.S. Army, and was stationed in Germany for three years; he also was married in 1960. After discharge from the Army, he and his wife, Holly settled in Zurich, Switzerland, where he worked as a painter and attended Eidgenössische Technische Hochschule, studying mathematics. Here he became interested in the possibilities of building innovative structures based on polyhedra (3D solids with flat polygonal faces).

Baer and his wife and two children moved back to the United States, settling in Albuquerque, New Mexico, where he initially worked as a welder of trailer frames for the Fruehauf Trailer Services company. In the 1960's, one of Baer's mentors was pioneer designer Peter van Dresser, whose work in American solar design and building had begun in the 1930s. Being inspired by reading Farrington Daniels' Direct Use of the Sun’s Energy in addition to working with van Dresser, Baer had become enthused about using solar energy for direct heating of buildings.

== Zomes ==
Baer and Ed Heinz experimented with constructing buildings of unusual geometries that they came to call "zomes" or zome architecture, often using heavy sheet metal as the main exterior material. Some of the earliest experiments were carried out in cooperation with members of the intentional communities Drop City and Maniera Nueva. During this period, he met and worked with Day Charhoudi, also a young solar experimenter, who taught him some principles of physics.

Early on, Baer became known as the author of Dome Cookbook and Zome Primer. His unconventional "zome" building-design approach, with its multi-faceted geometric lines, has been taken up by French builders in the Pyrenees. A 2004 book, Home Work edited by Lloyd Kahn, has a section featuring these building.

Baer eventually designed wide-ranging elaborations using the basic principles. Victor Papanek, a disciple of Frank Lloyd Wright and later a professor at the Rhode Island School of Design, praised Baer’s innovations in the applications of passive solar energy and also in housing-structure design.

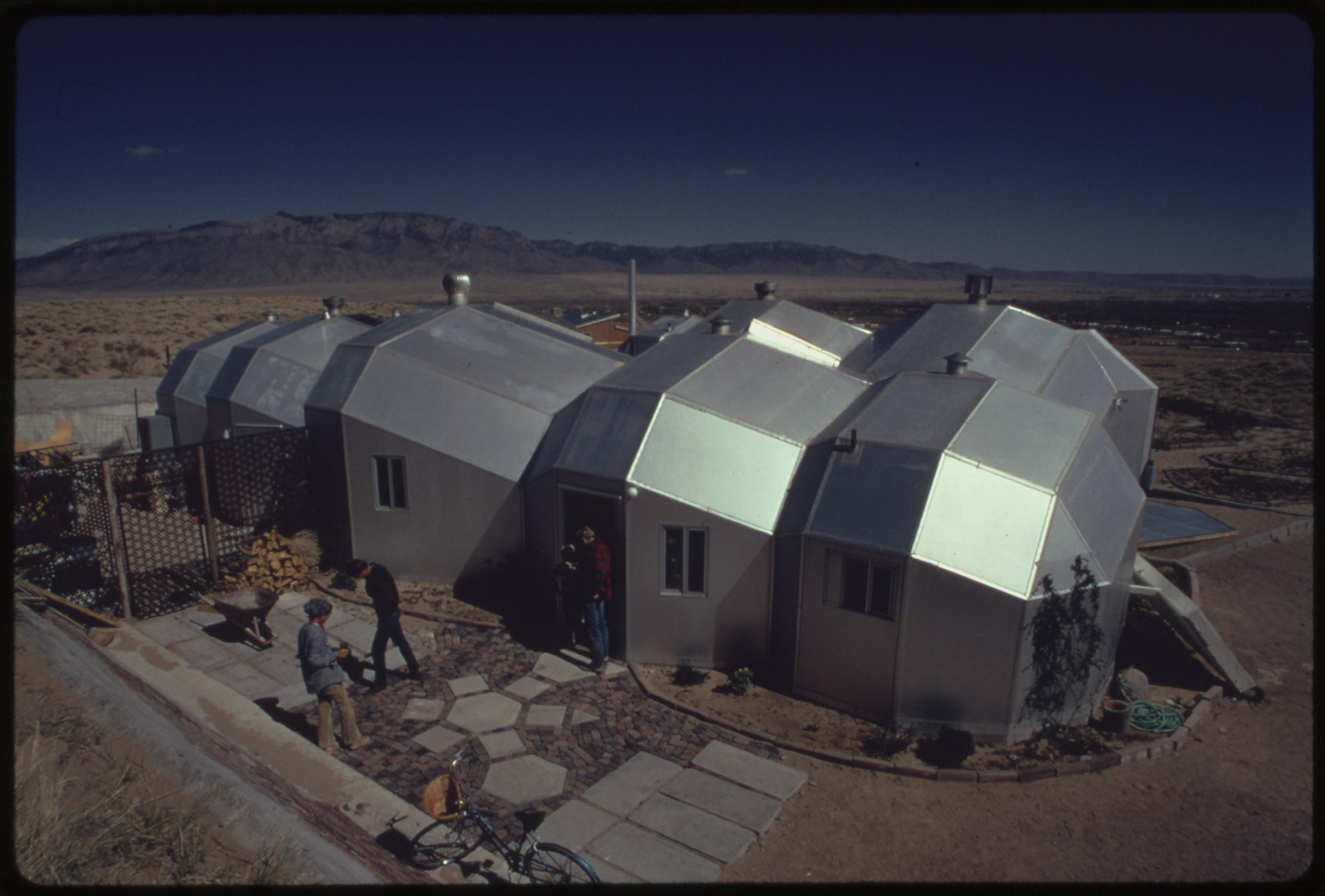
Zome house using solar heating built near Corrales, New Mexico, designed by Steve Baer.

== Zomeworks Corporation ==
In 1969, Baer founded a company named Zomeworks in Albuquerque, New Mexico, with Barry Hickman and Ed Heinz. Through the years, Baer was president and director of the company, remaining active in the areas of concept, experimentation, testing, and development. The company's stance was to eschew government support, and to function strictly as a business.

Baer began to experiment with practical methods, always seeking to simplify his approach as the experiments proceeded. In spring of 1969, Baer was a key organizer of, and presenter at, an important grassroots conference called Alloy, held near La Luz, New Mexico. Alloy convened Western-U.S. innovators in design and construction fields. According to Andrew Kirk, history professor in the University of Nevada, "...many of the attendees, mostly unknown outside a small circle, were on the cusp of interesting and unlikely careers as proponents of what came to be known as the appropriate-technology and ecological design movements." Kirk deemed most of the key presenters at Alloy to have been influenced by the ideas of Richard Buckminster Fuller

Baer benefited with wider recognition when he established connections with the Whole Earth Catalog (WEC), a product of Stewart Brand and Dick Raymond along with various collaborators. The Fall 1969 edition of the (WEC) carried simply a book review by Baer and a brief description of what Zomeworks was doing at that point;. When a detailed article about the Alloy conference was published on five full, large-format pages in the voluminous 1971 WEC edition (distributed far and wide by Random House), Baer and Zomeworks began to gain a reputation among solar enthusiasts in the U.S.

In the early years at Zomeworks, Baer was able to work with other innovators and idea people, solar designer Day Chahroudi being one, and also Dave Harrison and Dick Henry. Baer’s approach was to develop strategies and products that simplify rather than complicate; this not only applied to the concept and design of devices, but equally to approaches that add to the self-sufficiency of a building and its occupants' control. In a taped interview, he explained his standpoint: "It’s like this tape recorder we’re using. A pencil can break on you and you can sharpen it with your thumbnail and go right on... but if a circuit board or a resistor or condenser quits somewhere inside this recorder, we’re stopped and there’s probably not a lot we can do about it. That makes me queasy sometimes… I believe the ground rules can be transformed so that technology simplifies life instead of continually complicating it."

"I care about the spirit of invention," Baer made clear, "I'm an inventor." Peter van Dresser and Baer, both by then prominent in the field, founded the New Mexico Solar Energy Association (NMSEA) in 1972.

Having developed along with the marketplace, features of devices Zomeworks markets are usable in either conventional or unconventional buildings and sites, and the company's design approaches are widely applicable; an aspect of the company has been consultation services to architects.

Zomeworks has designed and manufactured a variety of different solar water heaters. One of Zomeworks' early inventions was the Beadwall (U.S. patent 3,903,665, expired), which consists of two sheets of glass with small styrofoam beads blown into the space between them by an air pump at night, to insulate the window areas of the building (the beads being removed by vacuum action in the morning).

The "Track Rack" solar tracker, which Baer and Zomeworks staff developed, is a metal-framed passive-solar dynamic mounting for photovoltaic (PV) modules. With an arrangement of two cylinders filled with freon and connected by a tube at their lowest point, the device uses the differential pressure and movement of entrapped liquid to enable gravity to turn the rack and follow the sun. Depending on heat and hydraulics, and without motors, gears, or computerized controls, the rack enables the PV module to face the sun ("sunflower-wise") for maximum efficiency. To meet the developing solar energy industry, Zomeworks has designed and builds several Track Racks to fit all common photovoltaic modules.

Another invention, the Skylid uses the same configuration of freon-filled cylinders to open and close insulating louvers under a skylight .

While Zomeworks has been known mainly for exploring passive solar strategies and equipment, some of the equipment the company has developed more recently, for solar-driven space cooling, has used active-solar principles. Baer attended the Art Basel fair, in Switzerland, where a full-scale replica of the Baers' own house was exhibited. In 1995, Baer's design work was included in the Contemporary Developments in Design Science exhibit, at St. John the Divine Cathedral, New York City.

== Death ==
Steve Baer died on May 17, 2024, at the age of 85.

Zomeworks Corporation is now solely owned by Benjamin Rodefer. Other key figures at Zomeworks throughout the years include Holly Baer, serving as the Director of Administration, Mike Elliston (as a Director) and David Nevin as Vice President. Dave Harrison and Sky Katona deserve credit for considerable contributions.

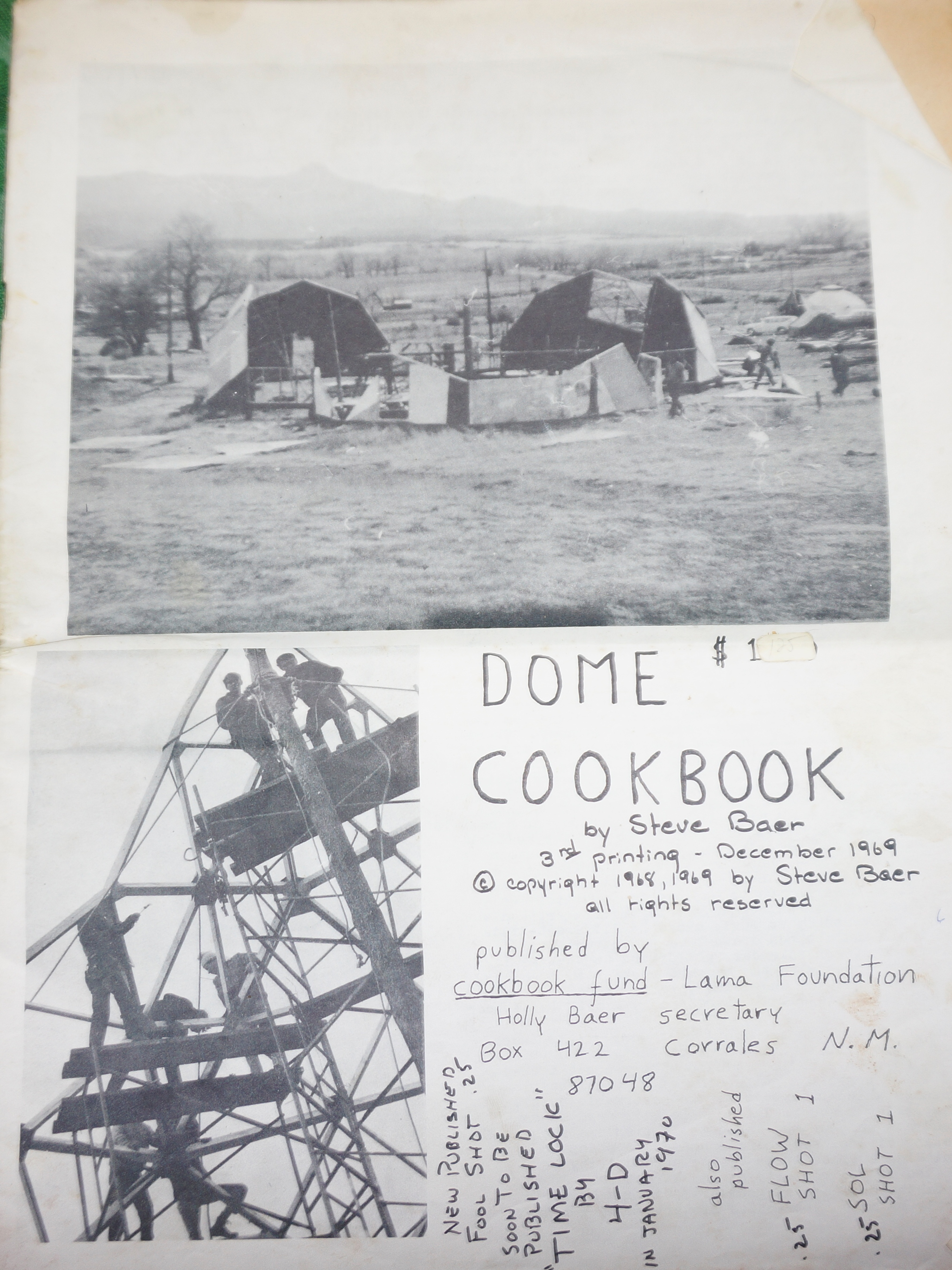
Dome Cookbook front cover

== Baer's Published Writings ==
- Baer, Steve (1968), Dome Cookbook, Albuquerque, NM: Lama Foundation
- Baer, Steve (1970), Zome Primer, Albuquerque, NM: Zomeworks Corporation
- Baer, Steve (1977), Sunspots: Collected facts and solar fiction, Albuquerque, NM: Zomeworks Corporation
- Baer, Steve (1977), "Corrales Residence", Passive Solar Heating and Cooling: Conference and Workshop Proceedings, May 18–19, 1976, University of New Mexico, Albuquerque, New Mexico, Washington, D. C.: Energy Research and Development Administration: 200, hdl:2027/mdp.39015009264428
- Baer, Steve (1977), "Movable Insulation", Passive Solar Heating and Cooling: Conference and Workshop Proceedings, May 18–19, 1976, University of New Mexico, Albuquerque, New Mexico, Washington, D. C.: Energy Research and Development Administration: 70–72, hdl:2027/mdp.39015009264428
- Baer, Steve (1979), Sunspots: An Exploration of Solar Energy Through Fact and Fiction, Albuquerque, NM: Rodale Press
- Baer, Steve (2012), More Sunspots, Corrales, NM: Baer Books

== Awards ==
- 2010 Global Award for Sustainable Architecture
