= Zome (architecture) =

Type of building

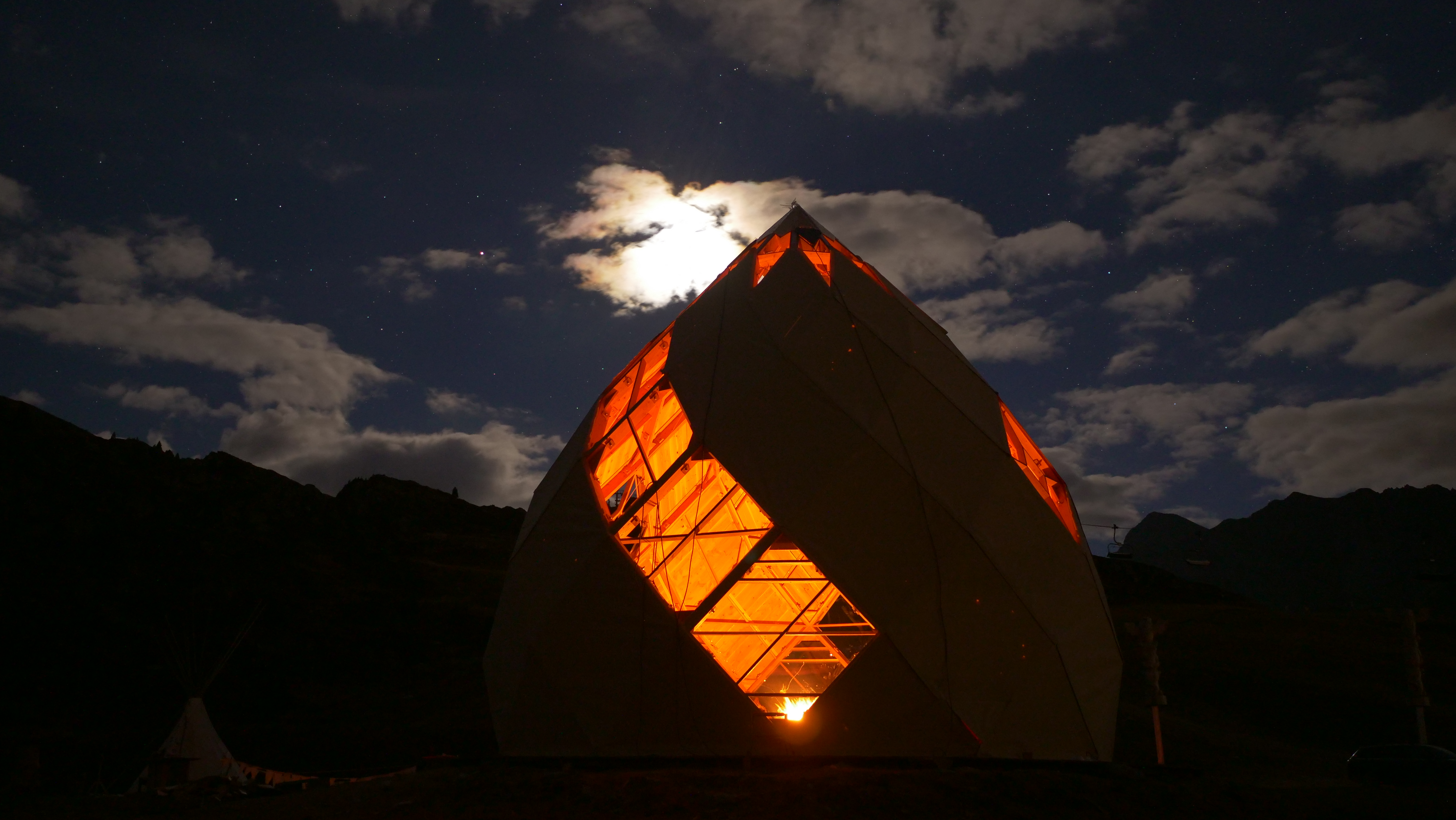
Zome by night

A zome is a building designed using geometries different from the rectangular boxes typical of most houses or buildings. The word zome was coined in 1968 by Nooruddeen Durkee (then Steve Durkee), combining the words dome and zonohedron. One of the earliest models became a large climbing structure at the Lama Foundation.

== Origin ==
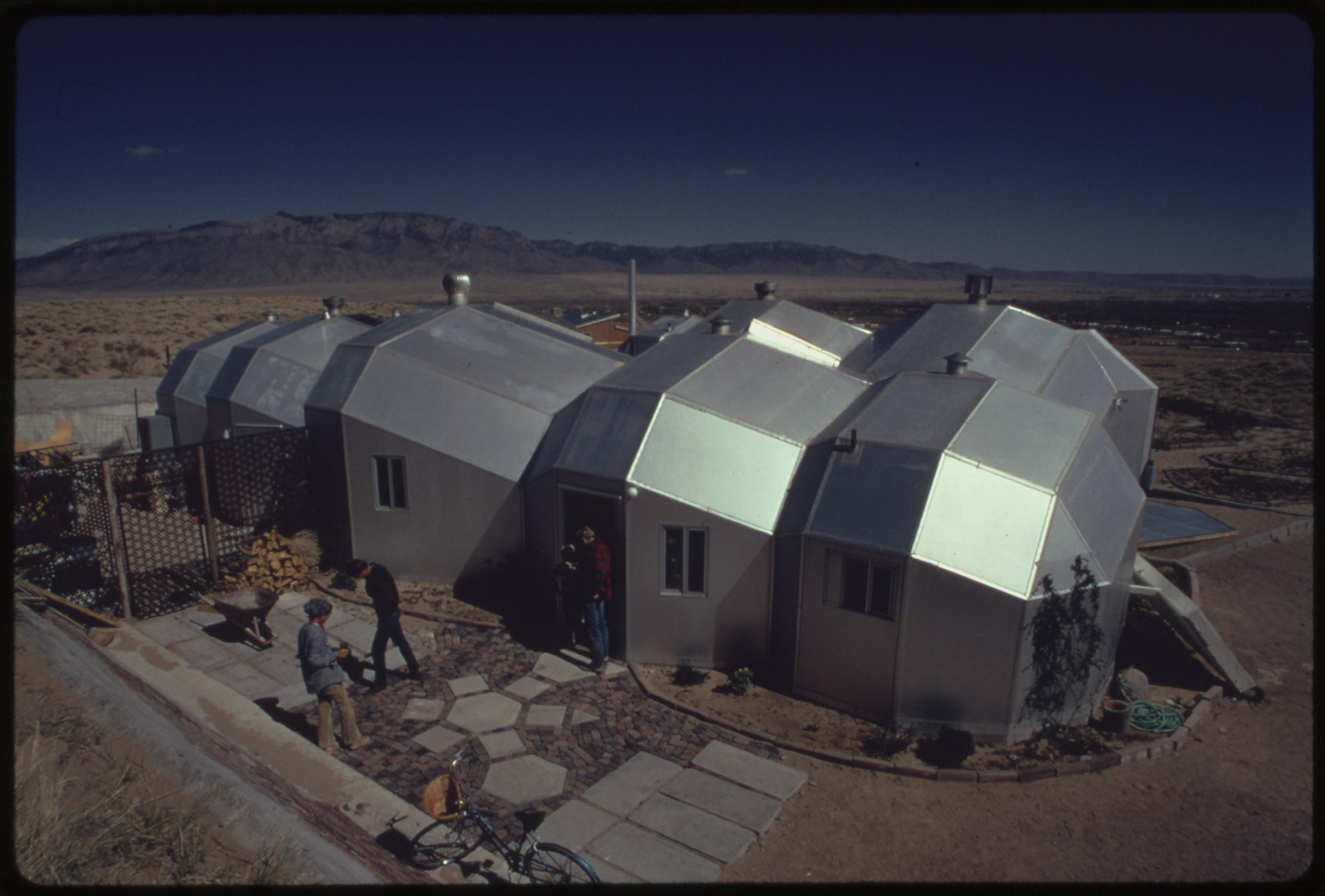
Zome house using solar heating built near Corrales, New Mexico, designed by Steve Baer.

Following his education at Amherst College and UCLA, Steve Baer studied mathematics at Eidgenössische Technische Hochschule (Zurich, Switzerland). Here he became interested in the possibilities of building innovative structures using polyhedra. Baer and his wife, Holly, moved back to the U.S., settling in Albuquerque, New Mexico in the early 1960s. In New Mexico, he experimented with constructing buildings of unusual geometries (calling them by his friend Steve Durkee's term: "zomes" — see "Drop City") — buildings intended to be appropriate to their environment, notably to utilize solar energy well. He was fascinated with the dome geometry popularized by architect R. Buckminster Fuller. Baer was an occasional guest at Drop City, an arts and experimental community near Trinidad, CO. He wanted to design and construct buildings that didn't suffer from some of the limitations of the smaller, owner-built versions of geodesic domes (of the 'pure Fuller' design).

== Gallery ==
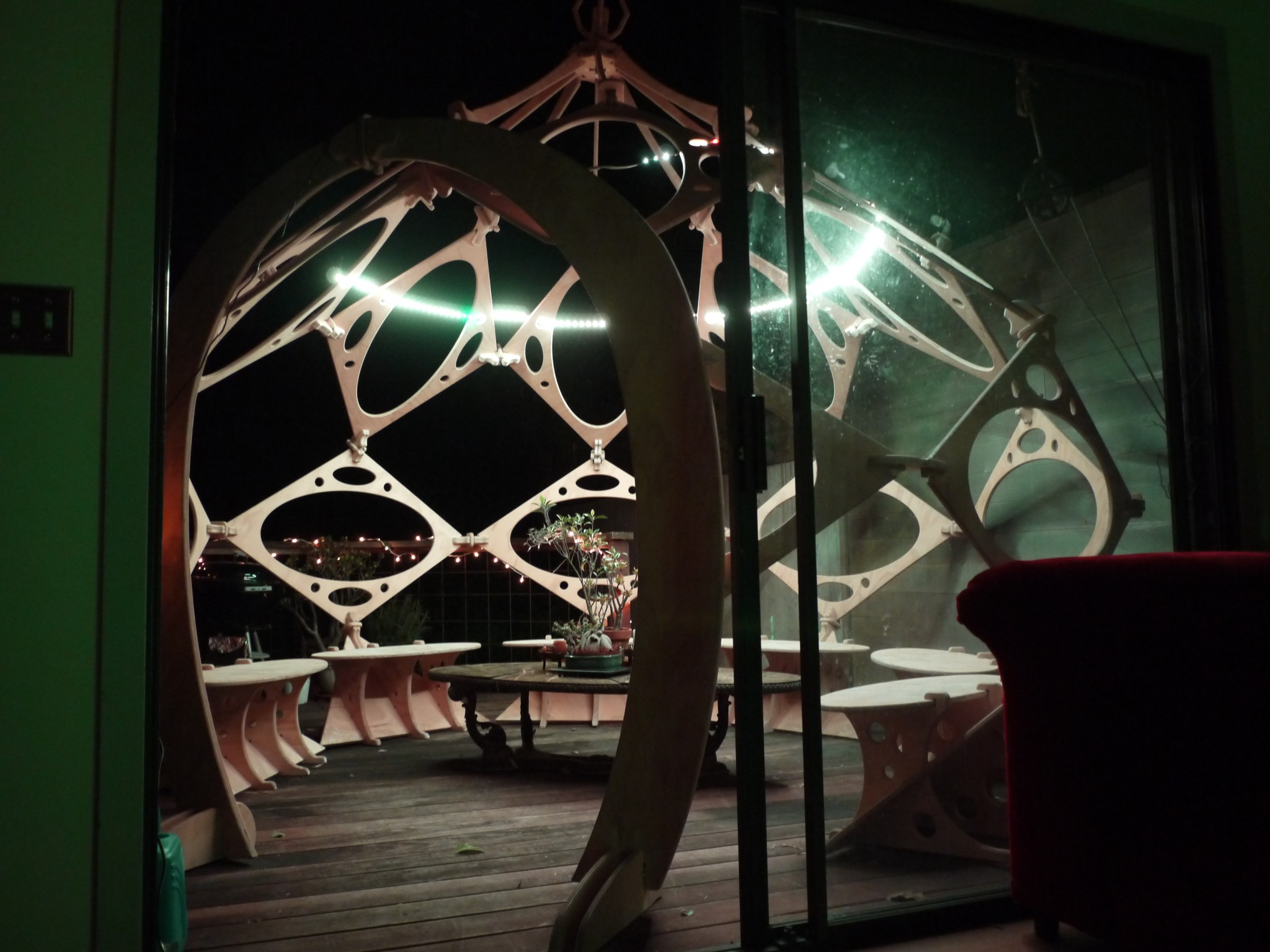

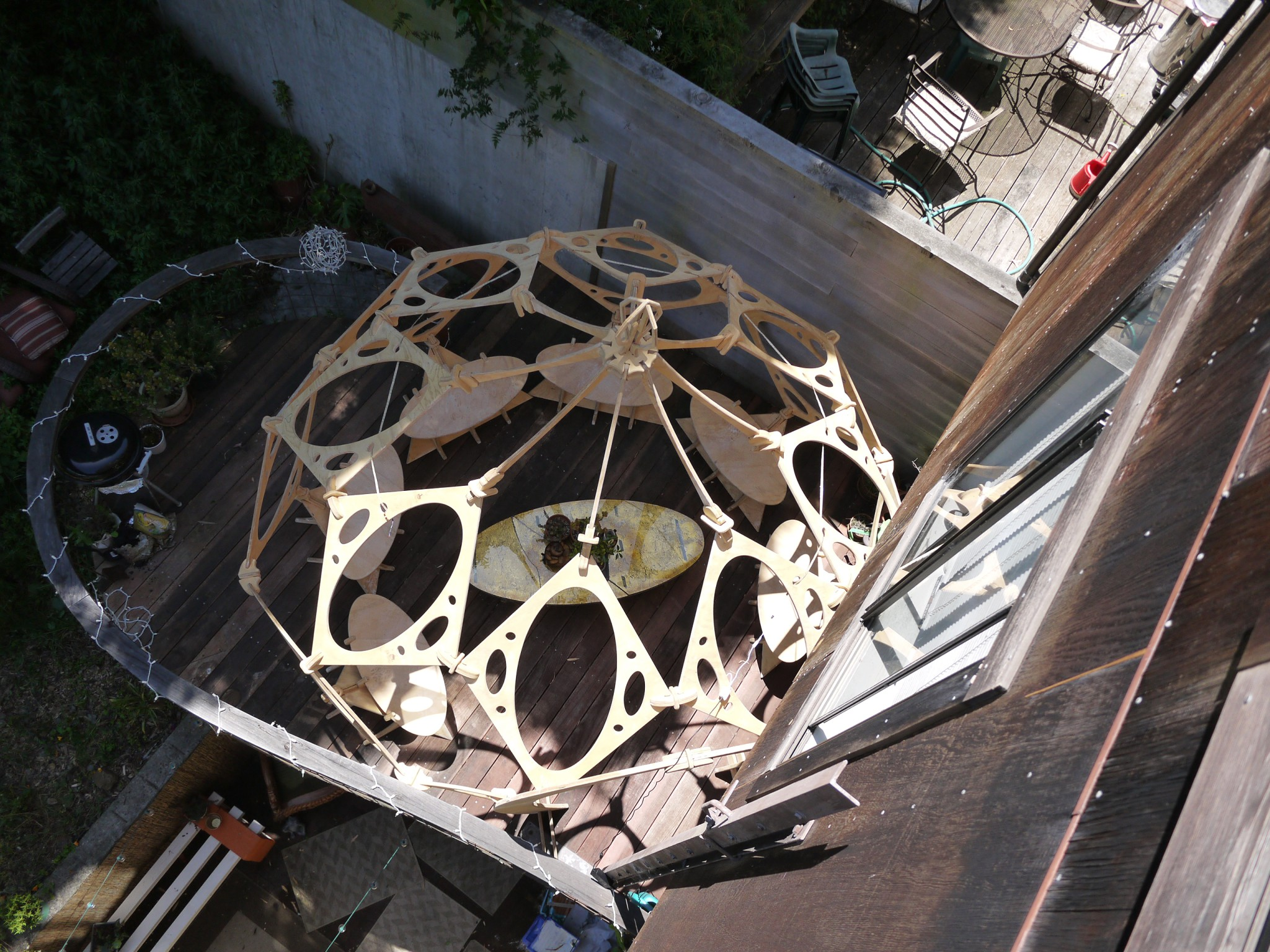

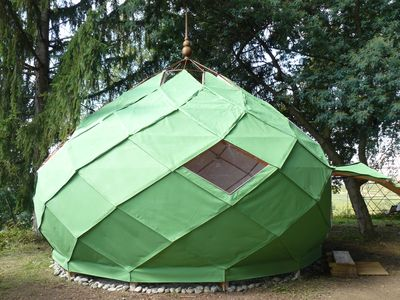

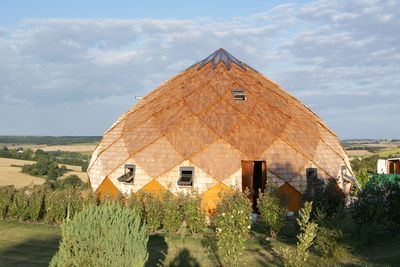

== Later developments ==
In recent years, the unconventional "zome" building-design approach with its multi-faceted geometric lines has been taken up by French builders in the Pyrenees. Home Work, a book published in 2004 and edited by Lloyd Kahn, has a section featuring these buildings. While many zomes built in the 21st century have been wood-framed and made use of wood sheathing, much of what Baer himself originally designed and constructed involved metal framing with a sheet-metal outer skin.

Zomes have also been used in art, sculpture, and furniture. Zomadic, based in San Francisco, CA and founded by Rob Bell, incorporates zome geometry into artistic structures constructed primarily from CNC machined plywood components. Bell is a frequent attendee at Burning Man, a yearly artistic showcase event located in the Black Rock Desert of Nevada.

Richie Duncan of Kodama Zomes, based in southern Oregon has invented a structural system based on a hanging zome geometry, suspended from an overhead anchor point. Constructed of metal compressive elements and webbing tensile elements, the structures are able to be assembled and disassembled. This suspended zome system has been used in furniture, performing arts, and treehouse applications.

Yann Lipnick of Zomadic Concepts in France has an extensive study of, and multiple project construction of zomes in many different materials. He highlights the universal appeal and healing atmosphere that zomes provide and has training classes and reference books on zome construction.
