= Clark Richert =

American artist (1941–2021)

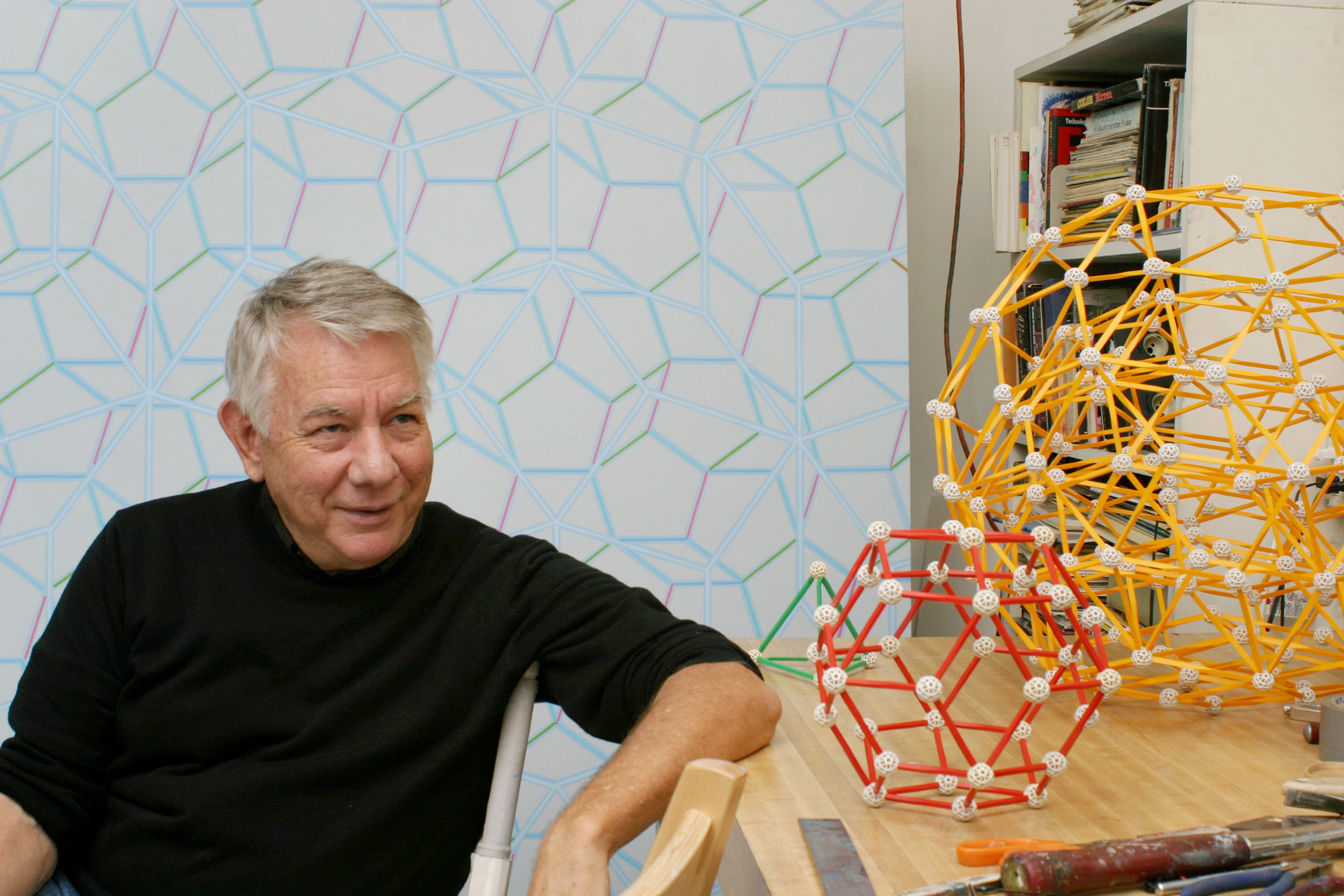
- Clark Richert photographed by Rule Gallery 2007
- Born: May 3, 1941; Wichita, Kansas, U.S.
- Died: December 24, 2021 (aged 80)
- Education: BFA, University of Kansas; MFA, University of Colorado Boulder
- Occupation: Artist

Clark Richert (May 3, 1941 – December 24, 2021) was an American contemporary artist largely known for his colorful geometric paintings, but whose practice included animation, video, intervention, happenings, and publishing. He also developed Drop City, an artist community near Trinidad, Colorado. He is considered to be one of Colorado's most important artists.

== Early life and education ==
Born in Wichita, Kansas, into a family of mathematicians and scientists, Clark assumed from an early age that he would go into one of those fields. But when he discovered Abstract Expressionism in high school, he immediately gravitated to art. He earned a Bachelor of Fine Arts at University of Kansas, and shortly thereafter was awarded a commission for the "Great Ideas of Western Man" series, sponsored by the Container Corporation of America, Chicago. The award monies enabled him to pursue his Master of Fine Arts at University of Colorado Boulder, where he became a driving force behind the Armory Group, a diverse and loosely affiliated collective of artists in the University of Colorado Boulder art school that included John DeAndrea, Margaret Neumann, John Fudge, Merle Laderman Ukeles, George Woodman, and others. During the University of Colorado's World Affairs Conference, Clark and fellow art students attended a seminar by Buckminster Fuller and became intrigued with his ideas.

== Drop City ==
In 1965, inspired by Fuller's vision, Clark and a handful of other art students took a hiatus from academic studies, moved to Southern Colorado, and established the experimental art community, Drop City. Here they could pursue not only their own aesthetics and artistic paths, but also Fuller's notions of synergy, geodesic dome houses, which they considered "live-in art;" and in Richert's case, his ideas about higher dimensional space. In 1966, the community received Buckminster Fuller's "Dymaxion Award" for poetically, economic, structural design.

Among many artistic activities at Drop City, Clark and other "droppers" created "The Ultimate Painting," a stroboscopic spin painting that was exhibited in 1968 at the Brooklyn Museum in the E.A.T. (Experiments in Art and Technology) Show.

While living at Drop City, Richert's art became increasingly structural. He explored higher dimensional tilings; and in 1969 discovered a geometric system that was later published under the title "Penrose Tiles" by mathematician Roger Penrose. (Richert insisted the correct term was "Richert-Penrose tiles.") He also pioneered the 61-zone fractal system.

== Criss Cross ==
After leaving Drop City, Clark moved first to New York City, where he worked with Third Eye Poster Company, putting his design skills to produce bold, geometric, black light posters. Subsequently, he relocated his family to Bernalillo, New Mexico and eventually returned to Boulder, Colorado; where he completed his graduate studies. During this period, he co-founded, with other, former Drop City residents, the Criss-Cross Artist's Cooperative. The group published a nationally distributed art journal, Criss Cross Art Communications, which focused on issues surrounding pattern and structures that continued concepts of peer-to-peer collaboration they had developed at Drop City. They organized what Peter Frank of the Village Voice called "guerilla exhibits" in New York and other locations; and drew members from around the world. With their collaborative approach and their intense focus on structure, Criss Cross became an important, albeit distinctive facet of the Pattern and Decoration movement in the 1970s and 1980s.

== Art career ==
Influenced by sources ranging from Herbert Bayer and the Bauhaus, Mark Rothko and participants in Black Mountain College, such as Kenneth Snelson and visionary architect R. Buckminster Fuller; Richert's early work tended toward Abstract Expressionism. Out of Allan Kaprow's Happenings, evolved the idea of "droppings." But as he progressed in his career, Clark became increasingly enamored with geometry and structure, addressing issues of art, science, math, and even spirituality through large, brilliant fields of intricate patterning.

Throughout his career, he grappled with "big ideas," such as the nature of space, the meaning of time, and the hidden unity in likenesses. His art anticipated a number of mathematical and science breakthroughs, such as non-periodic tiling and quasi-crystals; and by introducing Paul Hildebrandt to Baer's Zometoy in 1973, and to Marc Pelletier in 1980, he laid the groundwork and inspired their creation of the Zometool toy used by many scientists and mathematicians, as well as other artists and young learners. An early proponent of the use of technology in art, Clark continued to evolve through his career in style and content, as well as in media—from complex pattern paintings to pictorial landscapes and figural work; and from droppings, happenings, cardboard, and canvases to wall and pavement murals, kinetic works, computer animations, and the animated sculpture, "Quadrivium," which was completed in 2019.

== Selected exhibitions and awards ==
=== Solo exhibitions ===
Richert's work has been in many solo exhibitions, including, but not limited to

- Z-Space, RULE Galley, Marfa, Texas (2021) and Denver, Colorado (2022)
- A dual retrospective comprising
  - Clark Richert in Hyperspace, MCA Denver. Denver, Colorado (2019)
  - Pattern and Dimensions, BMoCA, Boulder, Colorado (2019)
- Wo-Wa-Wo and Virtual Drop City, Studio 31, (Chelsea), New York City, New York (2001)
- Unfolding the Vacuum, Arvada Center for the Arts & Humanities, Arvada, Colorado (1997)
- World Game, Payton-Rule Galley, Denver, Colorado and Denver Art Museum (1990)
- Five-fold Symmetries, Hopper Gallery, Taos, New Mexico (1973)
- Installation, Composing Room Gallery, New York City, New York (1969)
- Five Paintings, Container Corporation of America, Chicago, Illinois (1963)

=== Group exhibitions ===
- HIPPIE MODERNISM: The Struggle for Utopia, Walker Art Center, Minneapolis, Minnesota, Cranbrook Art Museum, Bloomfield Hills, Michigan, University of California, Berkeley Art Museum and Pacific Film Archive (2015–2017)
- WEST OF CENTER, Museum of Contemporary Art, Denver, Colorado, Scottsdale Museum of Contemporary Art, Arizona (2011–2012)
- GeoTHEMES, Gallery 128, New York City, New York (2010)
- Nature of Things, Biennial of Americas, Denver, Colorado (2010)
- Denmi, Miami Basel Exposition, Miami, Florida (2009)
- Driven to Abstraction, Kirkland Museum, Denver, Colorado (2008)
- RXART BALL, RxArt, New York City, New York (2006)
- View from Denver, Museum of Modern Art, Vienna, Austria (1998)
- Constructivist Work, Art Research Center, Kansas City, Missouri (1978)
- Experiments in Art and Technology (EAT) Exhibition, Brooklyn Museum, New York City, New York (1969)

=== Collections ===
Smithsonian Museum; Nelson-Atkins Museum; Wichita Art Museum; Denver Art Museum; Kirkland Museum; Art Museum, University of Colorado, Boulder; Amoco; Container Corporation of America, The Born Hotel; the ART, a hotel; as well as many other prominent private collections.

=== Awards and honors ===
- Great Ideas of Western Man series, Container Corporation of America (1963)
- Purchase Award, Wichita Art Museum (1963)
- Purchase Award, Nelson-Atkins Museum (1964)
- Buckminster Fuller's Dymaxion Award (1966)
- National Endowment for the Arts Fellowships (2) (1981)
- Recipient of Afkey Award, Alliance for Contemporary Art, Denver Art Museum (1984)

== Educator ==
After moving to Denver in the 1980s, Richert launched a teaching career that spanned three decades, most notably at Rocky Mountain College of Art and Design, now in Lakewood, Colorado. As teacher and Head of the Fine Arts department at RMCAD, he had a profound influence on his students, his colleagues and the curriculum. He was widely renowned for inspiring and mentoring young artists and facilitating their entry into the art world; as well as for promoting new ideas and programs, such as the Institute for Experimental Studies and an Immersive Arts program. Former students include: Jason Hoelscher, Jenny Morgan, Gregory Hayes, Xi Zang, Sterling Crispin, Dmitri Obergfell, Travis Edgedy (aka Pictureplane), Joseph Coniff, and Tya Alisa Anthony.

A strong adherent to Buckminster Fuller's philosophy of synergetics, Clark brought people together in the name of art, whether in the classroom, at an artists’ community, a cooperative gallery, a local café where he regaled other artists with his theories and stories and listened intensely to theirs, or in a board room of a museum.

== Personal life ==
Richert married fellow art student Diane Bromley in 1964; they divorced in 1965. While living at Drop City, Clark met and married Susie Jane Lybarger. The couple had two children—Luther, born in 1968 and Hannah, born in 1970. They divorced in 1975. In 1985, he became involved with Barbara Ittner, with whom he shared a friendship that began in the late 1970s. They became partners, and remained close companions until Clark's death in 2021. After his death, Barbara took on the role of personal representative of Richert's estate.
