= Gloria Klein =

American painter (1936–2021)

- Born: September 12, 1936
- Died: September 23, 2021 (aged 85)
- Known for: Painting
- Movement: Pattern and Decoration

Gloria Klein (September 12, 1936 – September 23, 2021) was an American painter based in New York City. Klein was a member of the Criss-Cross art cooperative. She died on September 23, 2021, at the age of 85.

== Work ==
Klein's work is primarily geometric and nonrepresentational, and she is considered a founding member of the Pattern and Decoration movement. Her work is included in the permanent collection at the Blanton Museum of Art.

== Exhibitions ==
Klein's work has been shown in solo and group exhibitions from the 1970s to the early 2010s, including three solo exhibitions at Gallery 128 in New York City. The feminist art publication Heresies included Klein's 1977 work Untitled in their "Lesbian Art and Artists" issue. Klein's works were also exhibited in "A Lesbian Show" at 112 Greene Street Workshop in New York, in 1978, which was curated by Harmony Hammond.

In addition to having her work featured, Klein has also organized exhibitions, including the Geometrics show reviewed by the New York Times.
