= Taylor Camp =

Former village in Kauaʻi, Hawaii

- Village
- Country: United States
- Established: 1969

Area
  - Total: 2.83 ha (7.0 acres)

Population (1974)
  - Total: 100
  - Density: 3,500/km^{2} (9,200/sq mi)
- Time zone: UTC-10 (Hawaii-Aleutian)

Taylor Camp was a small settlement established in the spring of 1969 on the island of Kauaʻi, Hawaii. It covered an area of seven acres (2.8 ha) and at its peak it had a population of 120. It began with thirteen hippies seeking refuge from the ongoing campus riots and police brutality in the United States. They were arrested for vagrancy but Howard Taylor, brother of movie star Elizabeth, bailed them out of jail and invited them to settle on a beachfront property he owned. Eduardo Malapit prosecuted the original Taylor campers; later as mayor, he campaigned to shut down the camp.

== Demise ==
The settlement was condemned in 1973, and residents, after losing legal battles, moved away over the years. There were only a few residents remaining in 1977, when the camp was raided by the local authorities where the residents were evicted by the state, and the camp buildings were burned to the ground. The site was turned into a state park and remains undeveloped.
