= Criss-Cross (art cooperative) =

== Origins ==
The Criss-Cross Art Cooperative grew out of the 1960s artists’ community Drop City in Southern Colorado. After leaving Drop City in the early 1970s, the five founders—Gene Bernofsky, JoAnn Bernofsky, Richard Kallweit, Charles DiJulio, and Clark Richert—began meeting in Boulder, Colorado, to explore their personal and shared artistic endeavors outside of the community. They brainstormed ways to survive as artists, where and how to show their work, and how to extend the peer-to-peer approach to art-making that they had practiced at Drop City. Out of their discussions came a core group of participants and the establishment of the Criss-Cross Art Communications (CCAC), an avante-garde art journal created to foster “group work, interaction, integration, and synthesis.” (1)

The periodical served as a platform for art-sharing, a sounding board for ideas, and an extension of the group’s reach and influence across the country. Over the years 1974-1981, Criss-Cross published 13 issues (in 10 volumes) of their partly grant-funded journal (2). According to one source, the distribution was 2,000 copies (3); but readership was likely higher, since many subscribers were libraries or institutions. As of this writing, some 53 libraries worldwide, still hold “some or a portion of copies of the journal.” (4) The Criss-Cross group also organized and participated in dozens of exhibits at galleries, art centers, and museums.

== A work in progress ==
In the first issue of the magazine, the editorial group stated “We hope to promote reciprocal communications between our rotating editorial group, those who submit ideas, and subscribers.” (5) In a later issue, art critic and curator Jeanie Wieffenbach wrote:

The intention of the magazine is to support and provide exposure to the best serious art being done in a region of the United States, roughly between Chicago and Los Angeles. The focus … is grounded in the conviction that significant work is being done in this region and that it is important to take up the challenge, too long ignored, of filling that information gap. (6)

This assessment was echoed in the essay “Why Not Here?” written by poet/playwright Sidney Goldfarb, published in the third issue and reprinted in the tenth issue of CCAC. (7) (8)

In the fourth issue, filmmaker Fred Worden, who became a key member of the editorial group, expanded. Criss-Cross, he said, was “an art magazine not oriented around a gallery/museum situation, nor interested in art magazines”, but rather it served as a forum for artists, including the editors, to present their work to one another, as well as to a wider, public audience. Worden went on to identify three qualities that distinguished the journal:

- group work/group process,
- the presentation of art directly from artists, and
- the de-centralization of art and culture.

He added,

My own feeling is that we need not concern ourselves with any sort of geographical identification, the whole issue of regionalism being a diversion as it applies to the purposes of this magazine … The real concern, it seems to me, has to do with encouraging an independence of attitude and contributing to a climate in which truly innovative ideas can evolve. (9)

Yet another member of the editorial group, painter Charles DiJulio, weighed in on the subject later, saying the group sought to "... locate other artists who speak our language, whose work corresponds to CC’s viewpoint and to bring this work and these artists together". (10)

== Group process ==
Indeed, the journal itself was the product of group work, with an “editorial team” of four artists under no hierarchical organization. Some names came and went, but over time the group came to typically include: filmmaker Fred Worden, painters Charles Di Julio and Clark Richert, and painter/sculptor Richard Kallweit. While these artists resided and worked in Colorado and their own work focused on issues surrounding pattern and structure; managing the magazine was an unstructured and inclusive operation. Editorial meetings were lively, discussions were heated, rules were broken, deadlines were missed, and publication dates sporadic; but the journals were eventually published. (11)

[insert photo 2]

Most of us are artists. We have expanded our sense of art to include all disciplines though which abstract concepts can be perceived and expressed,” the editors wrote, adding “with the exception of poetry.” (12) Notably, poetry and poets (e.g., Robert Creeley, Ed Dorn) were featured in CCAC. In fact, that same issue contained the work of poet Jack Collom. (13) In an effort for transparency and perhaps a stimulus for further discussion, the editorial group sometimes published notes on their planning process, e.g., lists from brainstorming sessions (14) (15) (16), and the essay, “Seeing/Thinking: Notes on organizing this exhibition. (17)

The magazine served as a fulcrum and alternate “exhibit space” for the Criss-Cross cooperative, providing a printed “gathering place” for artists who wished to give their work greater exposure; and exhibits, often curated by the Criss-Crossers themselves, brought artists together face-to-face in various venues throughout the country. “Organizing exhibits is simply a form of practicing group work,” Charles Di Julio commented in an article called “Criss-Cross and Pattern.” (18) Some exhibits were held in Colorado (e.g., “Criss-Cross Pattern Project” at Boulder Art Center, which included work from many New York and California artists, and “Colorado State of the Arts: Colorado Criss-Cross” at Denver Art Museum”). But the group also staged a series of openings “Constructivist Works” in collaboration with Art Research Center in Kansas City, MO (between 1977-1985 (19); and they traveled to New York, where they showed work at Hansen Gallery (“Systemic Patterning,” among other galleries, and at what critic Peter Frank of The Village Voice termed a “guerilla gallery.” (20) By organizing and staging group exhibitions around the country the Criss-Crossers met and recruited more artists to contribute to the journal and to participate in more shows at galleries.

== Members and participants ==
There was no formal membership application for Criss-Cross, no membership card, no dues, no educational or resume requirements. Simply put, any artist who participated in a Criss-Cross exhibit or contributed to the journal was considered a member. But a dedicated core group formed that was composed of individuals who worked with geometry, pattern, perception, and mathematical systems, whether they be painters, sculptors, filmmakers, sound artists (musicians and composers), or mathematicians. Included were members of the Criss-Cross journal’s editorial group (Worden, Di Julio, Kallweit, and Richert) as well as painters Marilyn Nelson and George Woodman, who also lived in Boulder, Colorado at that time. As the journal gained momentum and Criss-Cross began showing their work outside of Colorado, other artists with similar aesthetic sensibilities, primarily from the New York City area, joined: Gloria Klein, Dee Shapiro, Tony Bechara, Robert Swain, Tony Robbin, Arnold Wechsler, Tom Johnson, Mario Yrisarry, and Mary Ann Unger.

The fact that artists from around the world had an opportunity to show and share their work in a nationally-distributed, professionally designed magazine or to be included in an exhibit without the judgement of critics and curators; but instead through a peer-to-peer process for inclusion turned out to be a great recruiting tool. The presentation of art directly from artists on glossy pages that were heavily illustrated, sometimes with color reproductions, offered great appeal. Hundreds of creatives eagerly submitted their work for publication, including Robert Janz, Richard Kostelanetz, Sue Etkin, Buky Schwartz, Phyllis Rosenblatt (from New York) and others from California (e.g., Jon Thogmartin, Craig Fuller, Elizabeth Hutchinson), Missouri (Jay Heuser, mathematician Marjorie Senechal), New Jersey, Massachusetts, and elsewhere. A handful of participants hailed from Europe: Kurt Kren from Austria, Guglielmo Achille Cavellini from Italy, and CAIRN, a cooperative gallery founded in Paris in 1976. (21) Some of the artists involved were already well-established in the art world through fame or notoriety (e.g., Stan Brakhage, Toni Basil, Alan Sondheim, Alvin Lucier, Bruce Connor); others were what could be called “emerging artists.” To all of them, the magazine offered great exposure.

When it came to magazine content, inclusivity ultimately trumped art styles and regional representation, with editors exercising their own judgment to include what would “simply make the best magazine possible, taking our material where we find it.” (22). Operating like an enthusiastic “show and tell” for artists, the journal embraced not only all types of media—paintings, sculpture, weaving/fabric arts, film, photography, sound art, music, dance, short stories, poetry, mathematical musings, interviews, political narrative—but representatives from virtually every art style, trend, and movement current to the era:

- color sensation (Robert Swain),
- word or text art (Peter Frank),
- pattern and decoration (Dee Shapiro, Tony Robbin, Gloria Klein),
- found art (Donald Lipski),
- feminist art (Susan Anker, Judith Bernstein, HERESIES collective),
- surrealism (John Fudge),
- neo-expressionism (Margaret Neumann),
- hyper-realism (John DeAndrea),
- postcard/stamp art (Edward Higgins III, Guglielmo Achille Cavellini)
- sound art (Alvin Lucier, Tom Johnson),
- science, mathematics, architecture (Steve Baer, Marjorie Senechal)
- experimental film (Stan Brakhage, Bruce Connor)
- avant-garde short stories and memoir excerpts (Henry Korn, Ronald Sukenick)
- contemporary dance (Barbara Dilley, Toni Basil).

[Insert photo 3]

Inclusivity expanded the Criss-Cross reach geographically as well, enabling Colorado artists to connect and mingle with artists particularly in New York City and other urban areas; and vice versa. In this respect, the journal served its purpose to de-centralize the art world in bringing a diversity of art and artists together within its covers.

Each issue brought fresh ideas and new approaches. The tone ranged from serious and scholarly, e.g., “Elementarism and the Prisms of Edward Lowe” by Gordon McConnell (23) to tongue-in-cheek, e.g., filmmaker Gene Bernofsky’s manifesto on “Lunar Power” (24). According to one reviewer, the periodical was “structured in style yet unpredictable in content, intellectual yet accessible, and experimental yet deliberate.” (25) Images were often brilliant (e.g., Di Julio’s braided wave paintings, Nelson’s vibrational, hexagonal grids, Kallweit’s colorful, fractal sculptures), intellectually engaging (e.g., Shapiro’s explorations of the Fibonacci Progression, Richert’s illusionistic depictions of the structure of space) or visually provocative (e.g., Klein’s obsessively organized grid system, Bruce Connor’s stark photos of punk bands in San Francisco’s bay area). Of course, the steady drumbeat of geometry and pattern continued throughout each published issue, with the members of the editorial group regularly featuring their own work, alongside like-minded artists. Two issues (26) (27) focused specifically on Criss-Cross exhibits and thus, were completely devoted to “Criss-Cross art.”

== Importance of pattern ==
In the early days, Criss-Crossers often referred to their work as “Systemic Art,” “Systemic Pattern Painting” or “Structuralism.” Their art grew out of the traditions of geometric abstraction and non-objective art, but it could be described as more experiential, with the intention of visually stimulating viewers, rather than converting them to an ideology. According to reviewer Gordon McConnell “their work and writings are generally free of the ideological burden which weighted earlier movements with unfulfilled promises of social and spiritual revolution.” (28) And eventually they became associated with a movement that was taking off in New York known as “Pattern & Decoration.” It was a relationship they did not shun, especially since many in their group were already active “P&D” participants; but some members of the core group took pains to distinguish their work from the more decorative threads of that movement by their strict grounding in mathematical explorations. Painter/photographer George Woodman wrote:

Pattern may be the life-blood of decoration, but in turn its life is founded on the power of the mind …. The work of the Criss-Cross group is marked by a vivid appreciation that certain orders of visual form can be realized only through the understanding and control of complete systems. (29)

Criss-Cross painter Marilyn Nelson described her passion for the process of pattern painting: Repetitious painting opens the soul to lost or precious memories. It is not tedious, never boring… As I translate my structures onto canvas, I become sensually aware of the interconnectedness of my life—that which enables these patterns and colors to flow within the structures, forming a unified whole.

She went on to identify five characteristics held in common by the Criss-Cross artists:

- Strong capacity for visual organization: focus and patience
- Field pattern perception
- Obsessiveness
- Ordering, counting
- Working process and material (30)

In describing their exhibit at Yellowstone, filmmaker Fred Worden ascribed these qualities to pattern work:

- Visually dense
- Perceptually active
- Methodology includes handling of systems and the adoption of ‘rules’ to govern the generation of form (31)

And Criss-Cross co-founder Clark Richert offered this definition of pattern and rationale for the movement: Pattern can be defined as a coherent system based on a periodicity of elements that repeat in a predictable manner. Pattern is fundamental to human perception and knowledge... It appears that Humans are under an evolutionary pressure to absorb large and more complex orders of information—and that this absorption is a necessity for survival. It is quite possible that pattern and pattern recognition will become even more important to the acquisition of knowledge and future evolution of humanity. (32)

In 1981, the Criss-Crossers published an issue (33) that focused on their exhibition at the Yellowstone Art Center in Montana. A photo of “Old Faithful” graced the cover of that issue, while a still shot of a mushroom cloud from Bruce Connor’s film, Crossroads, appeared on the back cover—explosive images that portentously illustrated what became the final issue of the magazine. One might say that CCAC went out with a “visual bang.” In their introductory remarks for the exhibit, curator Christopher Warren and director Donna M. Forbes aptly described the group:

Just as contemporary science finds itself intrigued with underlying organization of nature—its patterned arrangements and principles of structure—these artists make visible an aspect of reality which transcends the world of appearance and the confinement of emotion and personal expressions. It reveals a world boundless and open-ended, large enough to welcome and engage the youngest eyes as well as the most lucid minds. (34)

In the early ‘80s. members of the core editorial group began to disperse geographically—Di Julio relocated to New York City. Worden moved to Denver and then to New York City. Kallweit lived in Denver for a few years before moving to Connecticut. Richert moved to Denver, where he stayed. But with funding growing scarce (35), the journal ceased publication after 1981. Criss-Crossers stayed in touch through letters and phone conversations; and they continued to exhibit their work and meet occasionally during the years that followed, usually in Colorado or New York. A show in 1983 at Pecanins Gallery in Mexico City, Mexico featured works by 7 Criss-Crossers along with Mexican sculptor Sebastian. (36) Decades passed until 2015, when the Museum of Friends in Walsenburg, CO, hosted a Criss-Cross show. And in 2016, a room at The Dairy Arts Center in Boulder was devoted to Criss-Cross as part of the HOVAB show. This was followed by an exhibit at Rule Gallery in Marfa, Texas, “In Proximity,” that featured work from 3 members of the editorial group- Richert, Di Julio and Kallweit. Then, in 2018, David Richards Gallery in New York City, hosted a show where new and earlier works by Clark Richert, Marilyn Nelson, Gloria Klein, Dee Shapiro, and Richard Kallweit were shown.

Over the relatively short span of its existence, Criss-Cross accomplished a great deal. Their original intentions—the de-centralization of art and culture, the presentation of art directly from artists to other artists and to the public, and the practice of group work- were met through the journal and through exhibitions, as well as through cultural forces of communication, technologies, and transportation. They brought their art to the large urban centers of New York, California and Mexico; and they brought artists and art from those places, to various locations in Colorado, and the West. The participating artists moved down their separate career paths- some becoming nationally and internationally renowned, (e.g., Mary Ann Unger, Dee Shapiro, George Woodman, and John DeAndrea) and many leading highly successful careers. (e.g., Clark Richert, Marilyn Nelson, Gloria Klein, Fred Worden.)

== Other resources ==
Artist’s Magazines: An Alternative Space for Art (MIT Press, 2011) available through google books: https://books.google.com/books?id=OZhNRP-wfkAC&pg=PA252&redir_esc=y#v=onepage&q&f=false

Henderson, Linda Dalrymple, The Fourth Dimension and Non-Euclidean Geometry in Modern Art, rev. ed., 2013, Massachusetts Institute of Technology
